= Avignon =

Prefecture of Vaucluse, Provence-Alpes-Côte d'Azur, France

Avignon Avinhon (Occitan)
- Prefecture and commune
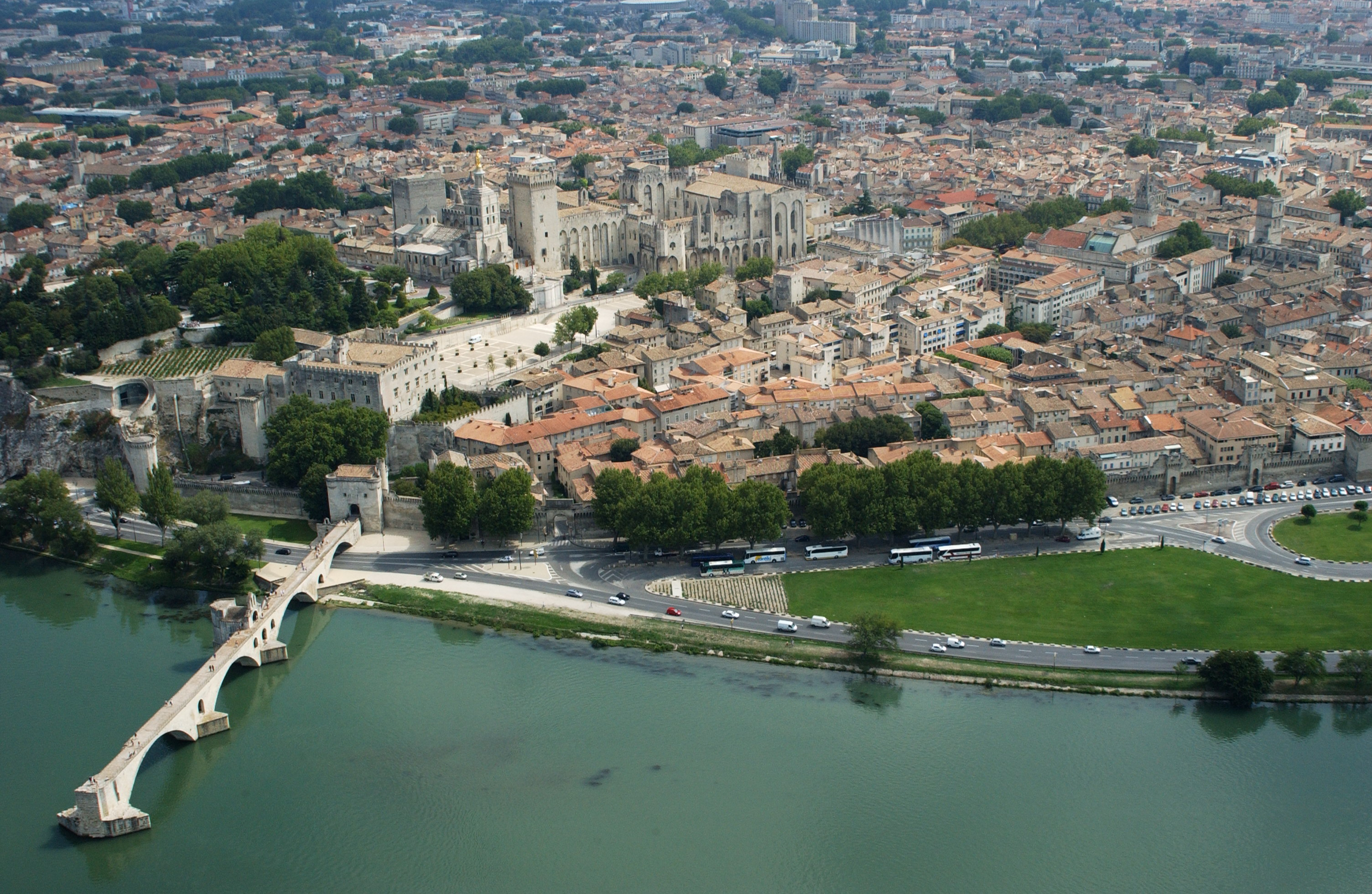
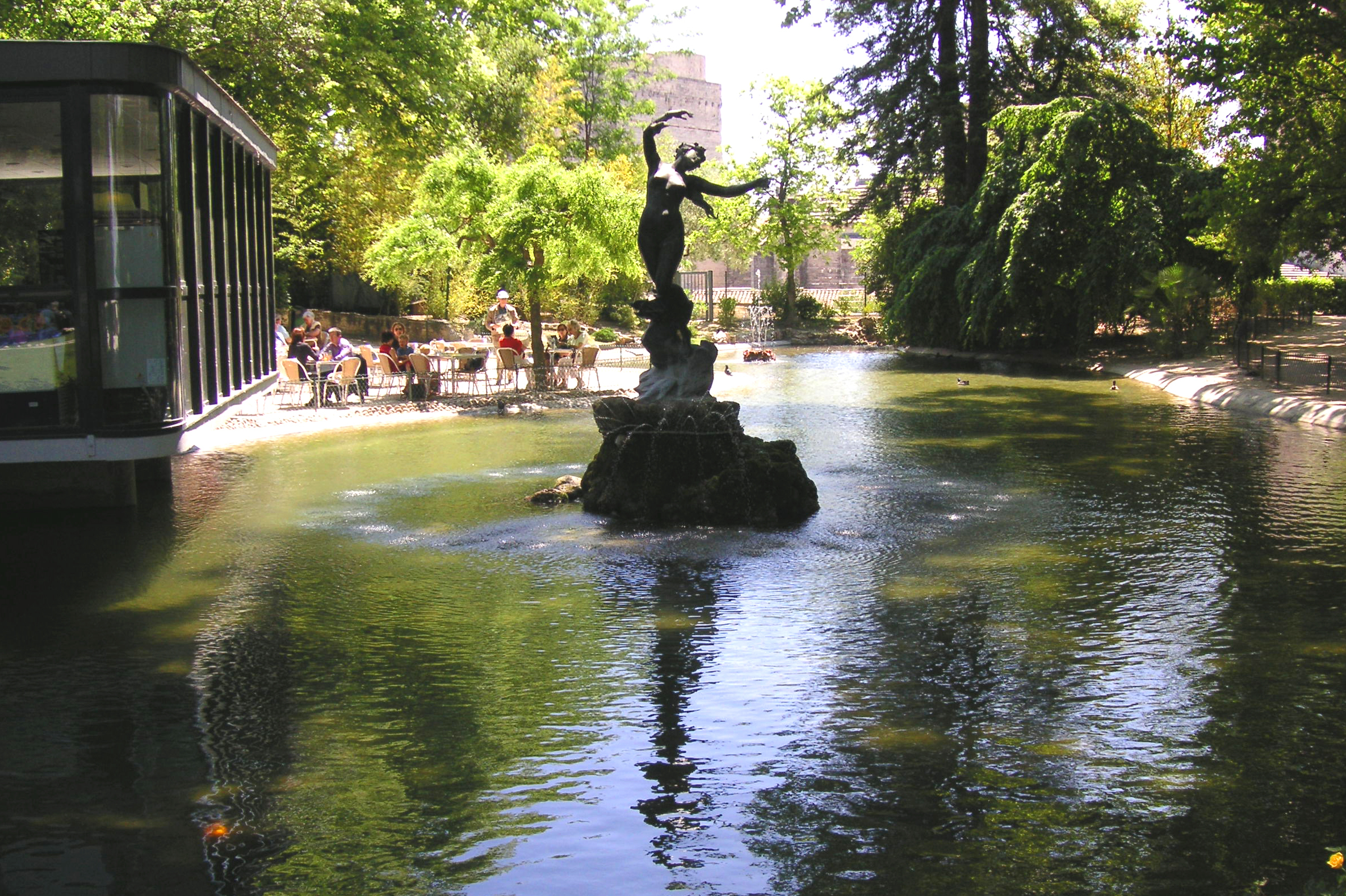
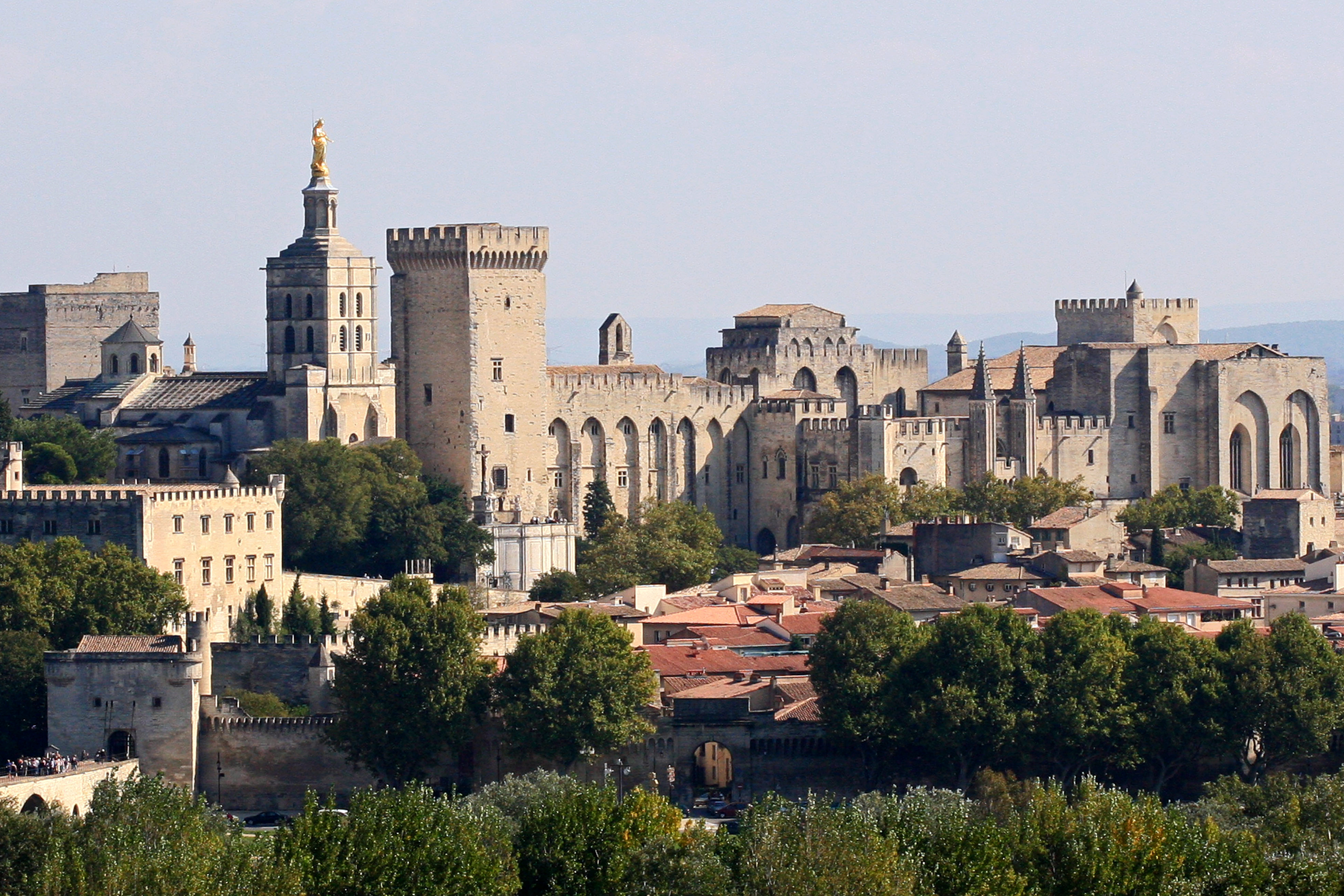
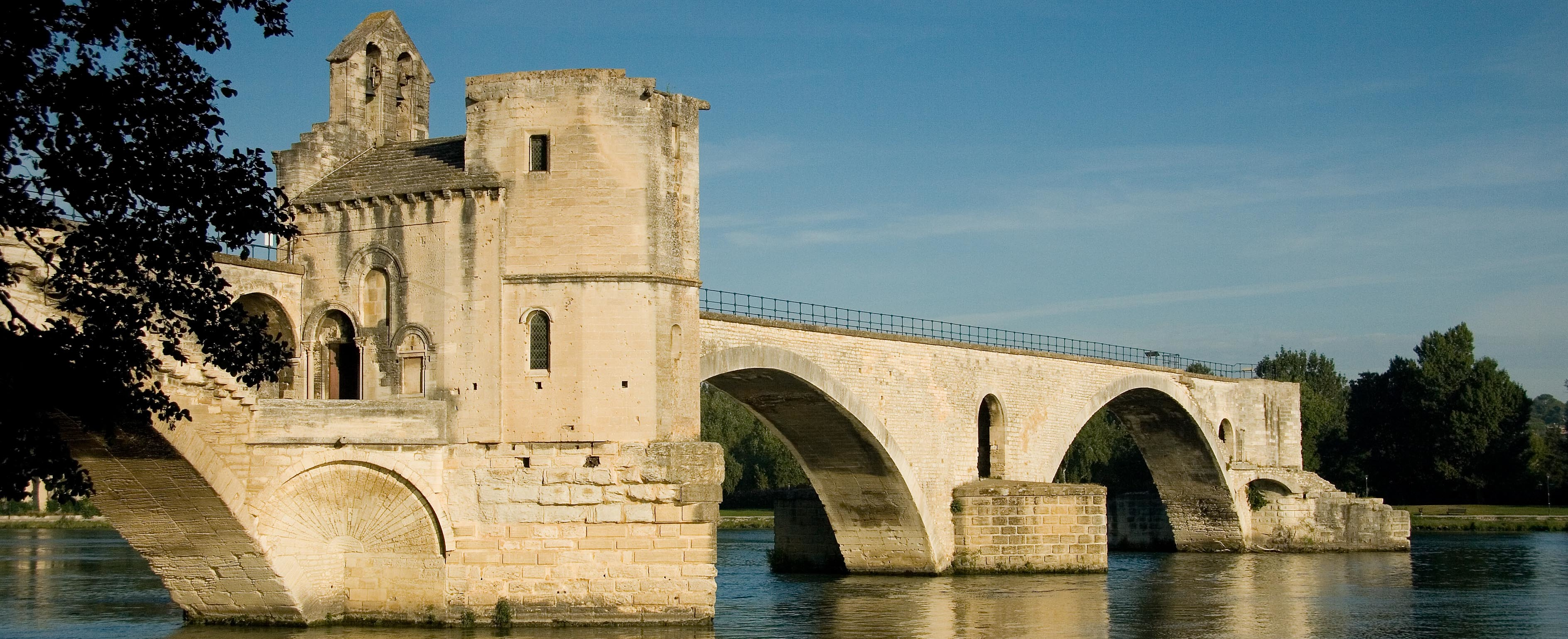
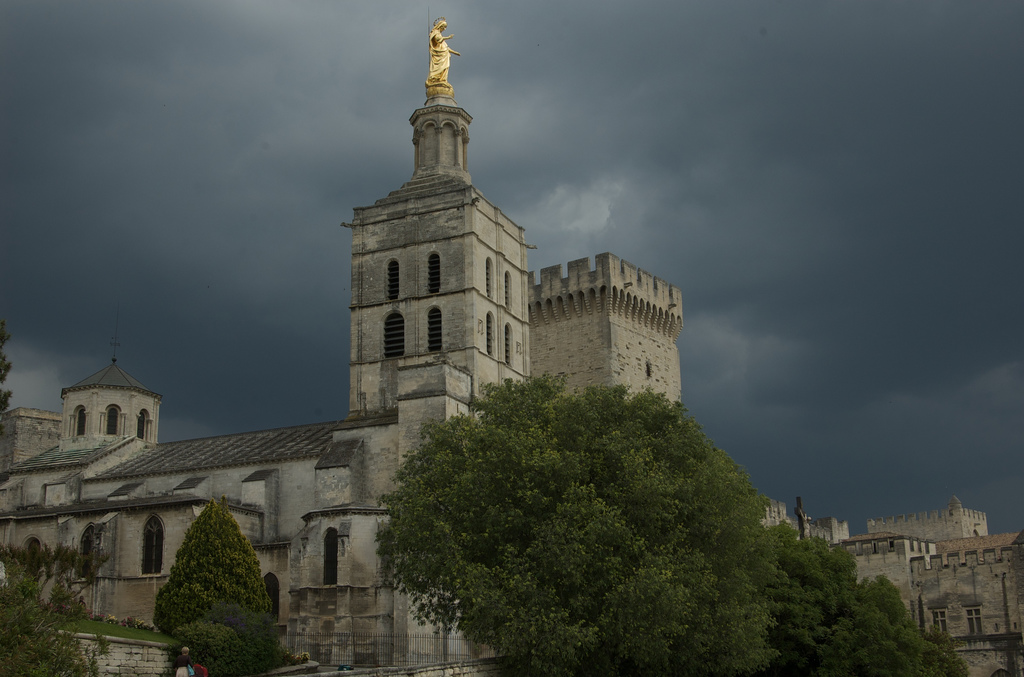
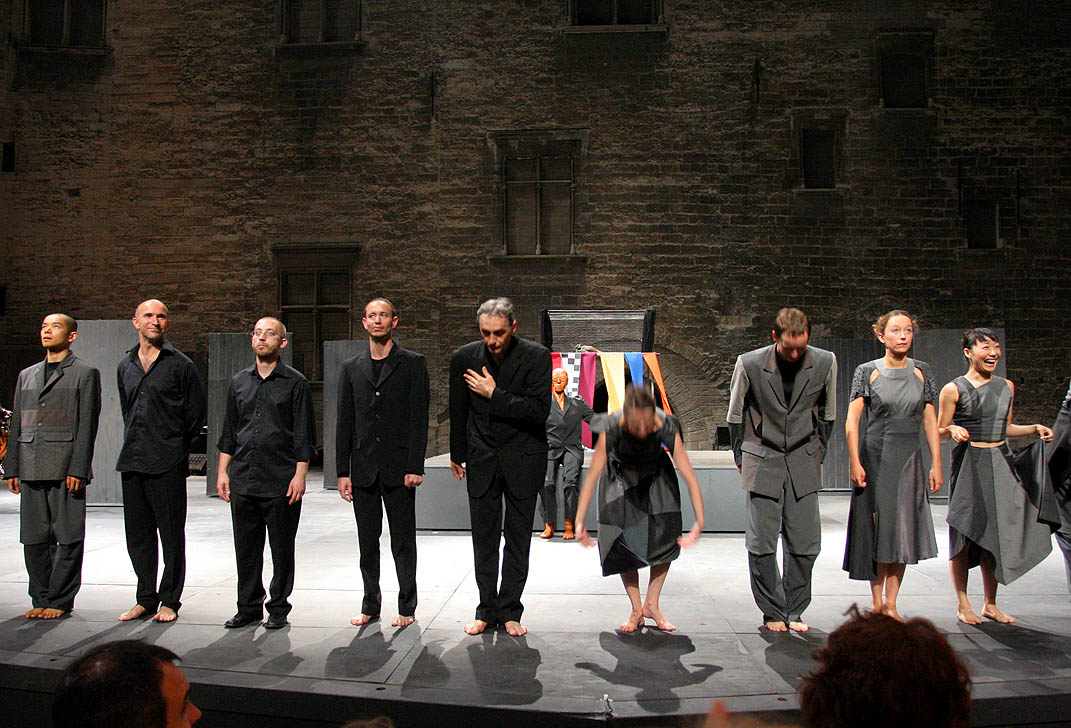
- City along the river Rhône Rocher des Doms Palais des Papes Pont Saint-Bénézet Avignon Cathedral Festival d'Avignon

- Flag Coat of arms
- Location of Avignon
- Location within France Location within Provence-Alpes-Côte d'Azur
- Coordinates: 43°57′00″N 04°48′27″E
- Country: France
- Region: Provence-Alpes-Côte d'Azur
- Department: Vaucluse
- Arrondissement: Avignon
- Canton: Avignon-1, 2, 3
- Intercommunality: CA du Grand Avignon

Government
  - Mayor (2026–32): Olivier Galzi (DVD)
- Area^{1}: 64.78 km^{2} (25.01 sq mi)
  - Urban (2020): 1,364 km^{2} (527 sq mi)
  - Metro (2020): 964 km^{2} (372 sq mi)
- Elevation: 23 m (75 ft)
- Highest elevation: 122 m (400 ft)
- Lowest elevation: 10 m (33 ft)
- Population (2023): 92,188
  - Density: 1,423/km^{2} (3,686/sq mi)
  - Urban (2023): 470,028
  - Urban density: 344.6/km^{2} (892.5/sq mi)
  - Metro (2023): 345,592
  - Metro density: 358/km^{2} (929/sq mi)
- Demonym: Avignonnais
- Time zone: UTC+01:00 (CET)
  - Summer (DST): UTC+02:00 (CEST)
- INSEE/Postal code: 84007 /84000
- Website: www.avignon.fr

UNESCO World Heritage Site
- Official name: Historic Centre of Avignon: Papal Palace, Episcopal Ensemble and Avignon Bridge
- Criteria: Cultural: i, ii, iv
- Reference: 228
- Inscription: 1995 (19th Session)
- Area: 8.2 ha (20 acres)
- ^{1} French Land Register data, which excludes lakes, ponds, glaciers > 1 km^{2} (0.386 sq mi or 247 acres) and river estuaries.

Avignon (/ˈævɪnjɒ̃/, US also /ˌævɪnˈjoʊn/; French: [aviɲɔ̃]; Provençal: Avinhon (Classical norm) or Avignoun (Mistralian norm), IPA: [aviˈɲun]; Latin: Avenio) is the prefecture of the Vaucluse department in the Provence-Alpes-Côte d'Azur region of southern France. Located on the left bank of the river Rhône, the commune has a population of 92,188 (2023), with about 16,000 (estimate from Avignon's municipal services) living in the ancient town centre enclosed by its medieval walls.

Between 1309 and 1377, during the Avignon Papacy, seven successive popes resided in Avignon and in 1348 Pope Clement VI bought the town from Joanna I of Naples. Papal control persisted until 1791 when during the French Revolution it became part of France. This is why Avignon is also known as La Cité des Papes ('The City of the Popes').

The city is the capital of the Vaucluse department and is one of the constituent municipalities in the Vaucluse and the Gard of the urban agglomeration of Grand Avignon with a combined population of 199,932 (2023).

The historic centre is one of the few cities in France to have preserved its mediaeval city walls and includes the Palais des Papes, Avignon Cathedral and the Pont d'Avignon. Due to its architectural and cultural importance during the 14th and 15th centuries, it was listed by UNESCO as a World Heritage Site in 1995. The medieval monuments and the annual Festival d'Avignon – one of the world's largest festivals for performing arts – have helped to make the town a major centre for tourism.

== Toponymy ==
The earliest forms of the name were reported by the Greeks: Аὐενιὼν Aueniṑn (Stephen of Byzantium, Strabo, IV, 1, 11) and Άουεννίων Aouenníōn (Ptolemy II, x).

The Roman name Avennĭo Cavărum (Mela, II, 575, Pliny III, 36), i.e. "Avignon of Cavares", accurately shows that Avignon was one of the three cities of the Celtic-Ligurian tribe of Cavares, along with Cavaillon and Orange.

The current name dates to a pre-Indo-European or pre-Latin theme ab-ên with the suffix -i-ōn(e). This theme would be a hydronym—i.e. a name linked to the river (Rhône), but perhaps also an oronym of terrain (the Rocher des Doms).

The Auenion of the 1st century BC was Latinized to Avennĭo (or Avēnĭo), -ōnis in the 1st century and is written Avinhon in classic Occitan spelling or Avignoun in Mistralian spelling. The inhabitants of the commune are called avinhonencs or avignounen in both standard Occitan and Provençal dialect.

== Geography ==
Avignon is on the left bank of the Rhône river, a few kilometres above its confluence with the Durance, about 580 km (360 mi) south-east of Paris, 229 km (142 mi) south of Lyon and 85 km (53 mi) north-north-west of Marseille. On the west it shares a border with the department of Gard and the communes of Villeneuve-lès-Avignon and Les Angles and to the south it borders the department of Bouches-du-Rhône and the communes of Barbentane, Rognonas, Châteaurenard, and Noves.

The city is in the vicinity of Orange (north), Carpentras (north-east), Salon-de-Provence, Aix-en-Provence, Marseille (all south-east), Arles (south), Nîmes and Montpellier (both south-west). Directly contiguous to the east and north are the communes of Caumont-sur-Durance, Morières-lès-Avignon, Le Pontet, and Sorgues.

=== Geology and terrain ===
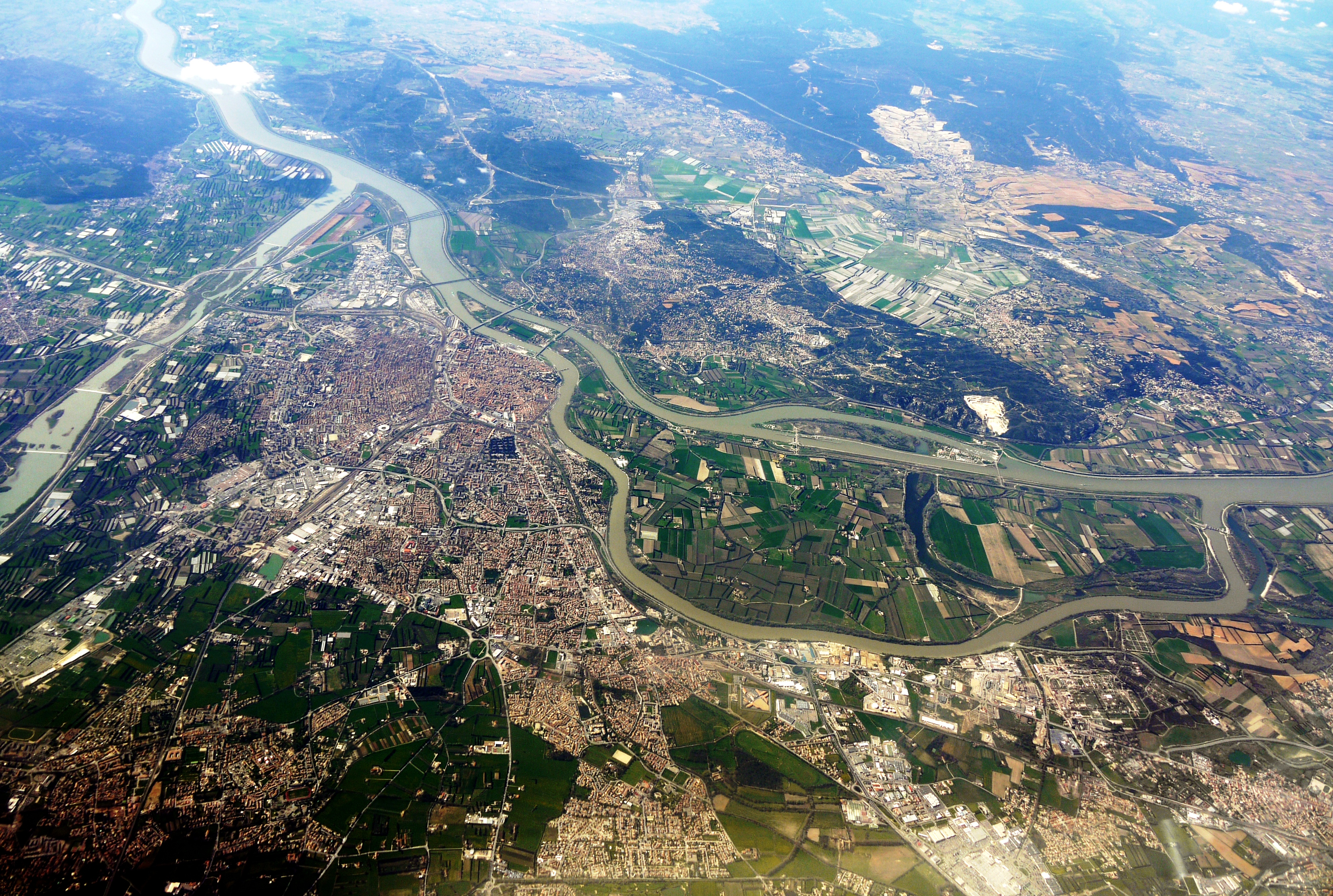
Aerial view of Avignon

The region around Avignon is very rich in limestone which is used for building material. For example, the current city walls, measuring 4,330 metres long, were built with the soft limestone abundant in the region called mollasse burdigalienne.

Enclosed by the city walls, the Rocher des Doms is a limestone elevation of Urgonian type, 35 metres high (and therefore safe from flooding of the Rhone which it overlooks) and is the original core of the city. Several limestone massifs are present around the commune (the Massif des Angles, Villeneuve-lès-Avignon, Alpilles...) and they are partly the result of the oceanisation of the Ligurian-Provençal basin following the migration of the Sardo-Corsican block.

The other significant elevation in the commune is the Montfavet Hill—a wooded hill in the east of the commune.

The Rhone Valley is an old alluvial zone: loose deposits cover much of the ground. It consists of sandy alluvium more or less coloured with pebbles consisting mainly of siliceous rocks. The islands in the Rhone, such as the Île de la Barthelasse, were created by the accumulation of alluvial deposits and also by human intervention. The relief is quite low despite the creation of mounds allowing local protection from flooding.

In the land around the city there are clay, silt, sand, and limestone present.

=== Hydrography ===
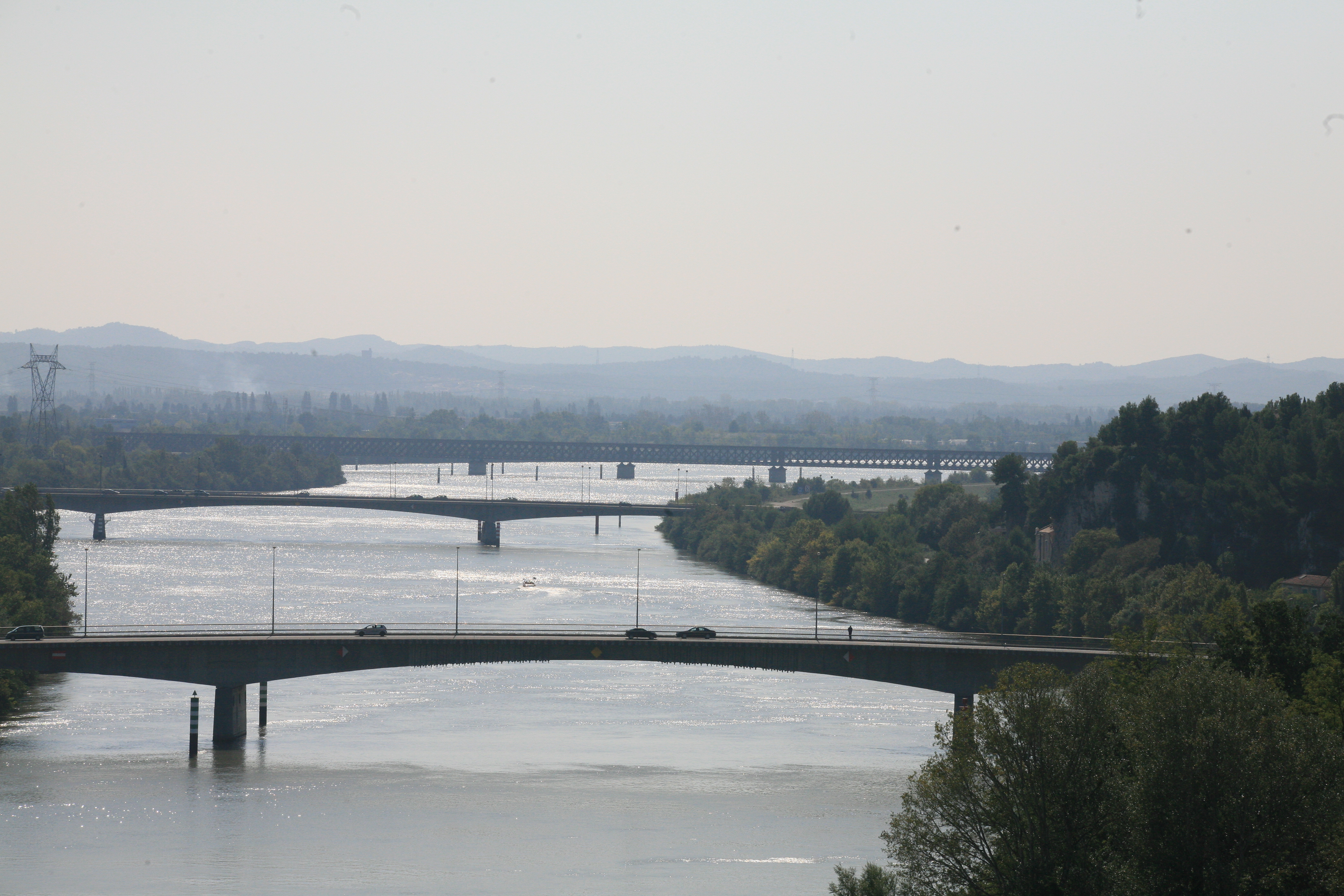
Bridges on the Grand Rhône.

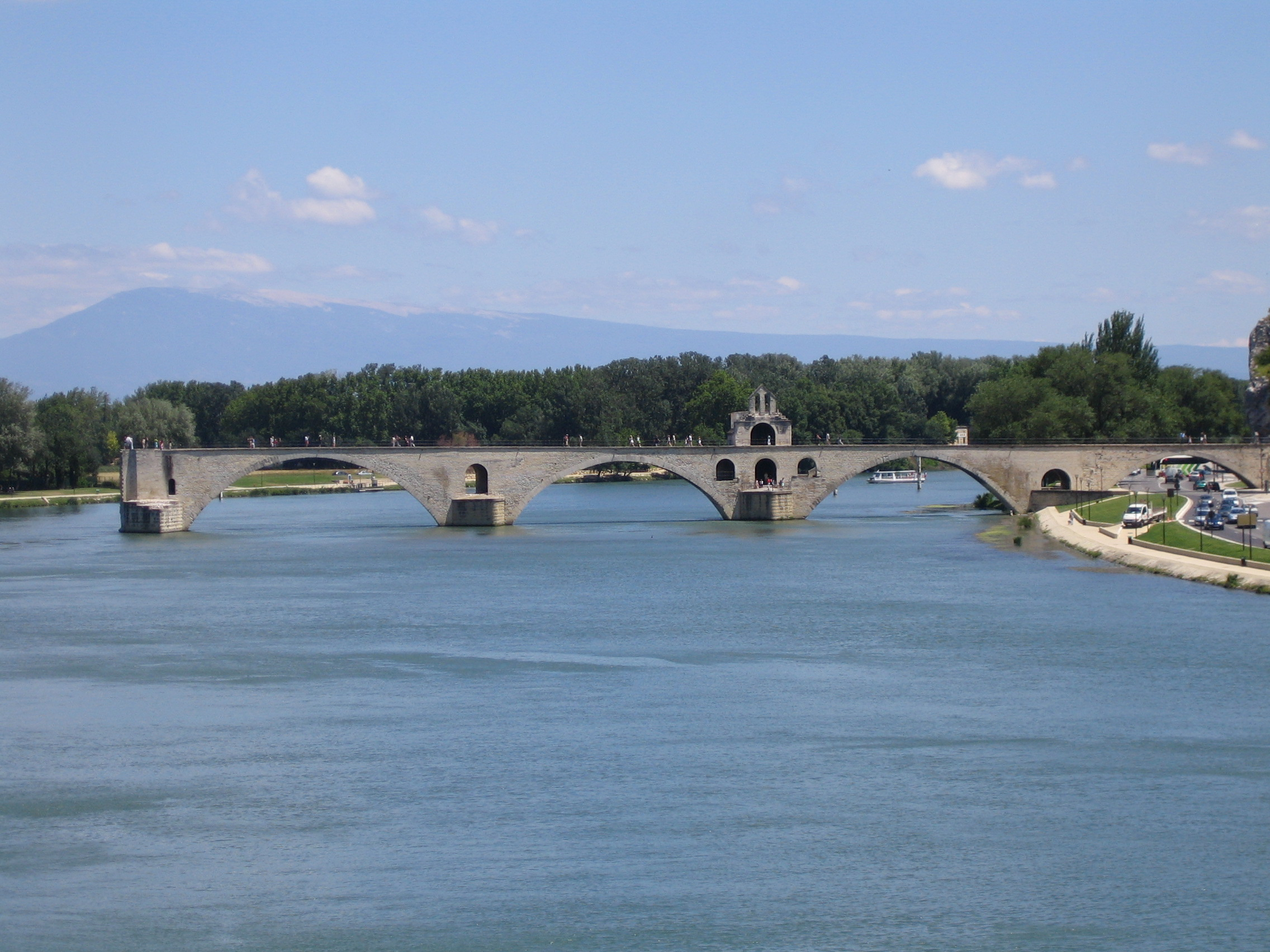
The Pont d'Avignon on the Petit Rhône. In the background is Mont Ventoux.

The Rhone passes the western edge of the city, but is divided into two branches: the Petit Rhône, or "dead arm", for the part that passes next to Avignon and the Grand Rhône, or "live arm", for the western channel which passes Villeneuve-lès-Avignon in the Gard department. The two branches are separated by an island, the Île de la Barthelasse. The southernmost tip of the Île de la Barthelasse once formed of a separated island, the L'Île de Piot.

The banks of the Rhone and the Île de la Barthelasse are often subject to flooding during autumn and March. The publication Floods in France since the 6th century until today – research and documentation by Maurice Champion tells about a number of them (until 1862, the flood of 1856 was one of the largest, which destroyed part of the walls). They have never really stopped as shown by the floods in 1943–1944 and again on 23 January 1955 and remain important today—such as the floods of 2 December 2003. As a result, a new risk mapping has been developed.

The Durance flows along the southern boundary of the commune into the Rhone and marks the departmental boundary with Bouches-du-Rhône. It is a river that is considered "capricious" and once feared for its floods (it was once called the "3rd scourge of Provence" (Note: Provençal tradition says that the first two were the mistral and the Parliament of Aix) as well as for its low water: the Durance has both Alpine and Mediterranean morphology which is unusual.

There are many natural and artificial water lakes in the commune such as the Lake of Saint-Chamand east of the city.

==== Artificial diversions ====
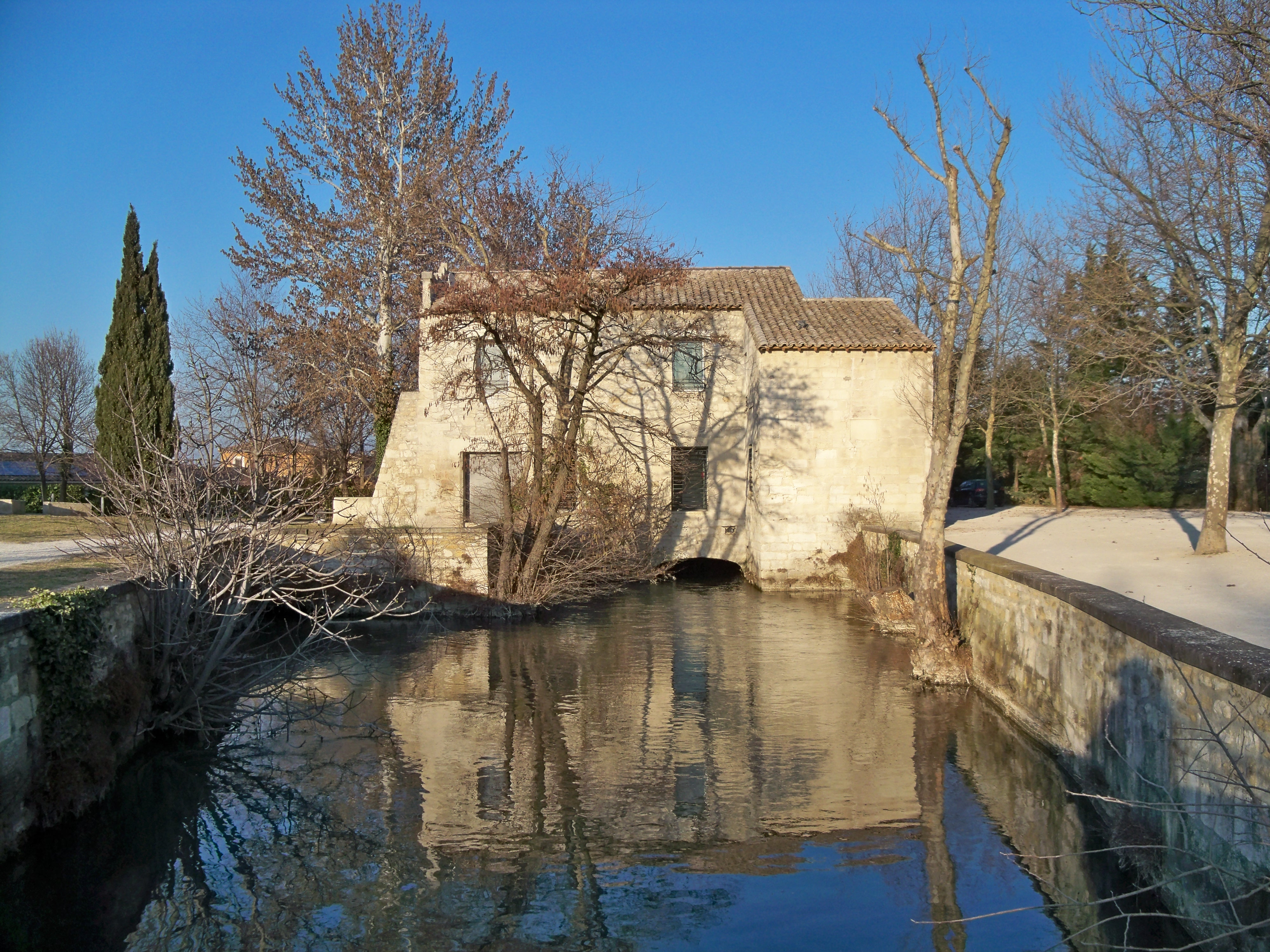
A mill on the Vaucluse Canal in the Pont des 2 eaux district

There have been many diversions throughout the course of history, such as feeding the moat surrounding Avignon or irrigating crops.

In the 10th century part of the waters from the Sorgue d'Entraigues were diverted and today pass under the walls to enter the city. (See Sorgue). This watercourse is called the Vaucluse Canal but Avignon people still call it the Sorgue or Sorguette. It is visible in the city in the Rue des teinturiers (street of dyers). It fed the moat around the first defensive walls then fed the moat on the newer eastern city walls (14th century). In the 13th century (under an Act signed in 1229) part of the waters of the Durance were diverted to increase the water available for the moats starting from Bonpas. This river was later called the Durançole. The Durançole fed the western moats of the city and was also used to irrigate crops at Montfavet. In the city, these streams are often hidden beneath the streets and houses and are currently used to collect sewerage.

The Hospital Canal (joining the Durançole) and the Crillon Canal (1775) were dug to irrigate the territories of Montfavet, Pontet, and Vedène. They were divided into numerous "fioles" or "filioles" (in Provençal filhòlas or fiolo). Similarly, to irrigate the gardens of the wealthy south of Avignon, the Puy Canal was dug (1808). All of these canals took their water from the Durance. These canals were initially used to flood the land, which was very stony, to fertilize them by deposition of silt.

All of these canals have been used to operate many mills.

=== Seismicity ===
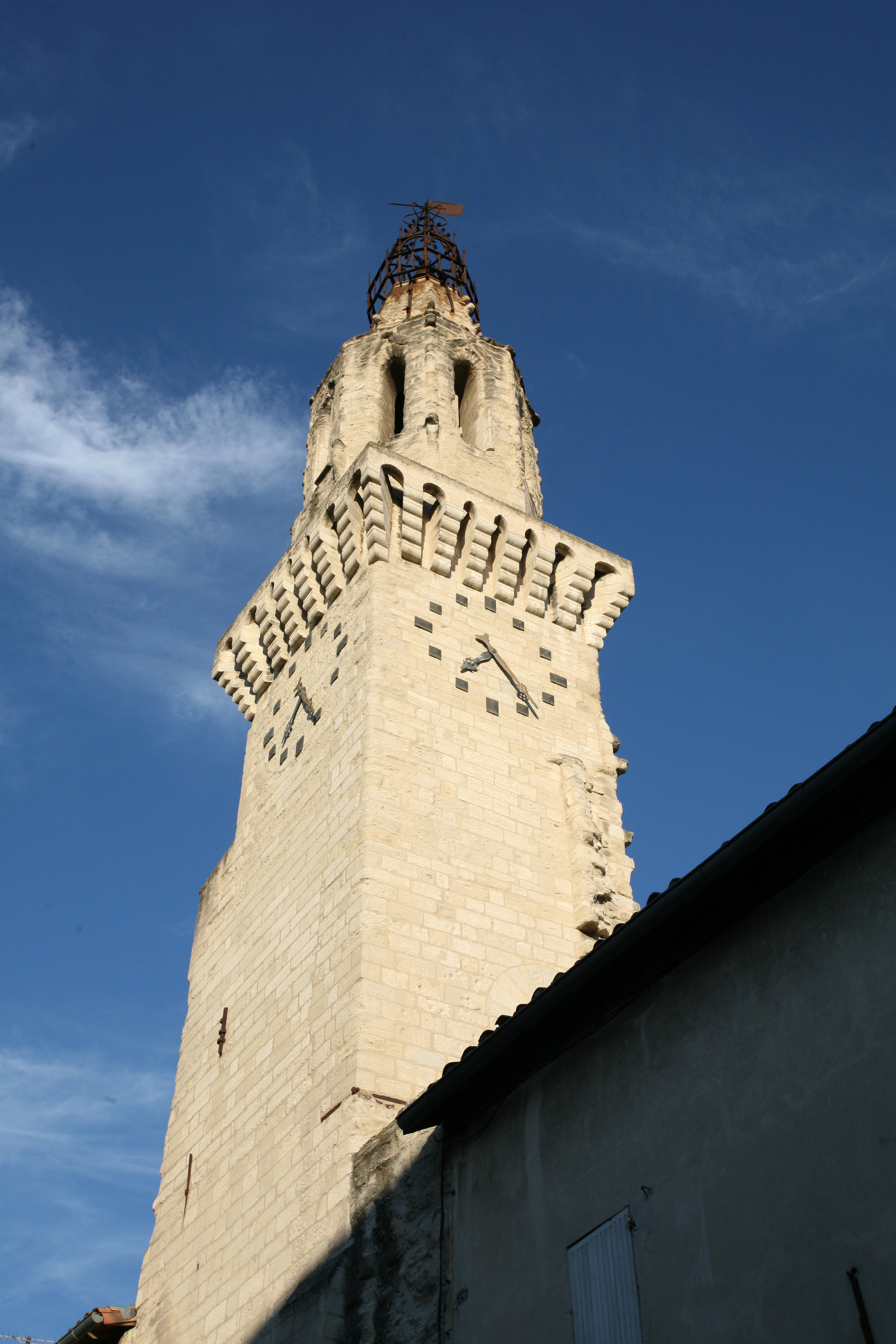
The leaning bell tower of the Church of the Augustinians.

Under the new seismic zoning of France defined in Decree No. 2010-1255 of 22 October 2010 concerning the delimitation of the seismicity of the French territory and which entered into force on 1 May 2011, Avignon is located in an area of moderate seismicity. The previous zoning is shown below for reference.

"The cantons of Bonnieux, Apt, Cadenet, Cavaillon, and Pertuis are classified in zone Ib (low risk). All other cantons the Vaucluse department, including Avignon, are classified Ia (very low risk). This zoning is for exceptional seismicity resulting in the destruction of buildings."

The presence of faults in the limestone substrate shows that significant tectonic shift has caused earthquakes in different geological ages. The last major earthquake of significant magnitude was on 11 June 1909. (Note: The épicentre was at Lambesc—a village in Bouches-du-Rhône.) It left a visible trace in the centre of the city since the bell tower of the Augustinians, which is surmounted by an ancient campanile of wrought iron, located in Rue Carreterie, remained slightly leaning as a result of this earthquake.

=== Climate ===
Avignon has a hot-summer mediterranean climate (Köppen climate classification: Csa), though the dry-summer effect is not as strong as coastal locations like Marseille due to its more sheltered inland location. The city experiences mild-cool winters and hot summers, with moderate rainfall year-round. The city is often subject to windy weather; the strongest wind is the mistral. A medieval Latin proverb said of the city: Avenie ventosa, sine vento venenosa, cum vento fastidiosa (Windy Avignon, pest-ridden when there is no wind, wind-pestered when there is).

Climate data for Avignon (1993–2020 averages, extremes 1993–present)
Month	Jan	Feb	Mar	Apr	May	Jun	Jul	Aug	Sep	Oct	Nov	Dec	Year
Record high °C (°F)	20.8 (69.4)	23.1 (73.6)	26.7 (80.1)	31.4 (88.5)	34.2 (93.6)	42.8 (109.0)	39.6 (103.3)	42.0 (107.6)	35.5 (95.9)	31.0 (87.8)	23.8 (74.8)	19.3 (66.7)	42.8 (109.0)
Mean daily maximum °C (°F)	10.7 (51.3)	12.4 (54.3)	16.6 (61.9)	19.7 (67.5)	23.9 (75.0)	28.7 (83.7)	31.5 (88.7)	31.1 (88.0)	26.0 (78.8)	21.0 (69.8)	14.7 (58.5)	11.0 (51.8)	20.6 (69.1)
Daily mean °C (°F)	6.3 (43.3)	7.4 (45.3)	10.8 (51.4)	13.7 (56.7)	17.8 (64.0)	22.1 (71.8)	24.8 (76.6)	24.3 (75.7)	19.9 (67.8)	15.8 (60.4)	10.3 (50.5)	6.7 (44.1)	15.0 (59.0)
Mean daily minimum °C (°F)	1.9 (35.4)	2.3 (36.1)	5.0 (41.0)	7.7 (45.9)	11.7 (53.1)	15.6 (60.1)	18.0 (64.4)	17.6 (63.7)	13.9 (57.0)	10.7 (51.3)	6.0 (42.8)	2.5 (36.5)	9.4 (48.9)
Record low °C (°F)	−8.7 (16.3)	−7.8 (18.0)	−9.9 (14.2)	−4.2 (24.4)	2.4 (36.3)	6.7 (44.1)	10.7 (51.3)	9.5 (49.1)	5.5 (41.9)	−2 (28)	−7.1 (19.2)	−8.6 (16.5)	−9.9 (14.2)
Average precipitation mm (inches)	55.6 (2.19)	35.6 (1.40)	36.1 (1.42)	59.9 (2.36)	52.3 (2.06)	35.2 (1.39)	23.9 (0.94)	35.0 (1.38)	91.1 (3.59)	88.6 (3.49)	92.0 (3.62)	43.5 (1.71)	648.8 (25.54)
Average precipitation days (≥ 1.0 mm)	5.7	4.8	4.4	6.5	6.0	3.7	2.6	3.3	5.2	6.0	7.5	5.2	60.9
Source: Météo France

The record temperature record since the existence of the weather station at Orange is 42.8 °C on 28 June 2019 and the record lowest was −14.5 °C on 2 February 1956.

==== The mistral ====
The prevailing wind is the mistral for which the windspeed can be beyond 110 km/h. It blows between 120 and 160 days per year with an average speed of 90 km/h in gusts. The following table shows the different speeds of the mistral recorded by Orange and Carpentras Serres stations in the southern Rhone valley and its frequency in 2006. Normal corresponds to the average of the last 53 years from Orange weather reports and that of the last 42 at Carpentras.

Legend: "=" same as normal; "+" higher than normal; "-" lower than normal

Speed of mistral winds in km/h
	Jan.	Feb.	Mar.	Apr.	May.	Jun.	Jul.	Aug.	Sep.	Oct.	Nov.	Dec.
Maximum recorded speed by month	106	127	119	97	94	144	90	90	90	87	91	118
Tendency: Days with speed 16 m/s (58 km/h)	--	+++	---	++++	++++	=	=	++++	+	---	=	++

== Demographics ==
Historical population

Year	Pop.	±% p.a.
1793	24,000	—
1800	21,412	−1.62%
1806	23,789	+1.77%
1821	29,407	+1.42%
1831	29,889	+0.16%
1836	31,786	+1.24%
1841	33,844	+1.26%
1846	35,169	+0.77%
1851	35,890	+0.41%
1856	37,077	+0.65%
1861	36,081	−0.54%
1866	36,427	+0.19%
1872	38,196	+0.79%
1876	38,008	−0.12%
1881	37,657	−0.19%
1886	41,007	+1.72%
1891	43,453	+1.17%
1896	45,107	+0.75%
1901	46,896	+0.78%

Year	Pop.	±% p.a.
1906	48,312	+0.60%
1911	49,304	+0.41%
1921	48,177	−0.23%
1926	51,685	+1.42%
1931	57,228	+2.06%
1936	59,472	+0.77%
1946	60,053	+0.10%
1954	62,768	+0.55%
1962	72,717	+1.86%
1968	86,096	+2.85%
1975	90,786	+0.76%
1982	89,132	−0.26%
1990	86,939	−0.31%
1999	85,935	−0.13%
2007	91,283	+0.76%
2012	89,380	−0.42%
2017	91,921	+0.56%
2023	92,188	+0.05%

Source: EHESS and INSEE

== Administration ==
Avignon is the prefecture (capital) of Vaucluse department in the Provence-Alpes-Côte-d'Azur region. It forms the core of the Grand Avignon metropolitan area (communauté d'agglomération), which comprises 15 communes on both sides of the river:

- Les Angles, Pujaut, Rochefort-du-Gard, Sauveterre, Saze and Villeneuve-lès-Avignon in the Gard département;
- Avignon, Caumont-sur-Durance, Entraigues-sur-la-Sorgue, Jonquerettes, Morières-lès-Avignon, Le Pontet, Saint-Saturnin-lès-Avignon, Vedène and Velleron in the Vaucluse département.

=== List of mayors ===
List of successive mayors

Mayors from the French Revolution to 1940

From	To	Name
1790	1790	Jean-Baptiste d'Armand
1790	1791	Antoine Agricol Richard
1791	1792	Levieux-Laverne
1792	1793	Jean-Ettienne Duprat
1793	1793	Jean-André Cartoux
1793	1793	Jean-François ROCHETIN
1795	1795	Guillaume François Ignace Puy
1795	1796	Alexis Bruny
1796	1796	Père Minvielle
1796	1797	Faulcon
1797	1798	Père Minvielle
1798	1799	Cadet Garrigan
1799	1800	Père Niel
1800	1806	Guillaume François Ignace PUY
1806	1811	Agricol Joseph Xavier Bertrand
1811	1815	Guillaume François Ignace Puy
1815	1815	Hippolyte Roque de Saint-Pregnan
1815	1819	Charles de Camis-Lezan
1819	1820	Louis Duplessis de Pouzilhac
1820	1826	Charles Soullier
1826	1830	Louis Pertuis de Montfaucon
1830	1832	François Jillian
1832	1833	Balthazar Delorme
1834	1837	Hippolyte Roque de Saint-Pregnan
1837	1841	Dominique Geoffroy
1841	1843	Albert d'Olivier de Pezet
1843	1847	Eugène Poncet
1847	1848	Hyacinthe Chauffard
1848	1848	Alphonse Gent
1848	1848	Frédéric Granier
1848	1850	Gabriel Vinay
1850	1852	Martial BOSSE
1852	1853	Eugène Poncet
1853	1865	Paul Pamard
1865	1870	Paul Poncet
1870	1871	Paul Bourges
1871	1874	Paul Poncet
1874	1878	Roger du Demaine
1878	1881	Paul Poncet
1881	1881	Eugène Millo
1881	1884	Charles Deville
1884	1888	Paul Poncet
1888	1903	Gaston Pourquery de Boisserin
1903	1904	Alexandre Dibon
1904	1910	Henri Guigou
1910	1919	Louis Valayer
1919	1925	Ferdinand Bec
1925	1928	Louis Gros
1929	1940	Louis Nouveau

Mayors from 1940

From	To	Name	Party
1940	1942	Jean Gauger	
1942	1944	Edmond Pailheret	
1944	1945	Louis Gros	
1945	1947	Georges Pons	
1947	1948	Paul Rouvier	
1948	1950	Henri Mazo	
1950	1953	Noël Hermitte	
1953	1958	Edouard Daladier	
1958	1983	Henri Duffaut	PS
1983	1989	Jean-Pierre Roux	RPR
1989	1995	Guy Ravier	PS
1995	2014	Marie-Josée Roig	UMP
2014	2026	Cécile Helle	PS
2026	current	Olivier Galzi	DVD

=== Twin towns – sister cities ===
Avignon is twinned with:

- Colchester, United Kingdom since 1972
- Guanajuato, Mexico since 1990
- Diourbel, Senegal since 1961
- New Haven, Connecticut, USA since 1993
- Siena, Italy since 1981
- Tarragona, Spain since 1968
- Tortosa, Spain since 1968
- Wetzlar, Germany since 1960

=== Evolution of the borders of the commune ===
Avignon absorbed Montfavet between 1790 and 1794 then ceded Morières-lès-Avignon in 1870 and Le Pontet in 1925. On 16 May 2007 the commune of Les Angles in Gard ceded 13 hectares to Avignon.

=== Area and population ===
The city of Avignon has an area of 64.78 km^{2} and a population of 92,078 inhabitants in 2010 and is ranked as follows:

Rank	Land Area	Population	Density
France	524th	46th	632nd
Provence-Alpes-Côte d'Azur	105th	5th	23rd
Vaucluse	6th	1st	2nd

== Economy ==
Avignon is the seat of the Chamber of Commerce and Industry of Vaucluse which manages the Avignon–Caumont Airport and the Avignon-Le Pontet Docks.

Avignon has 7,000 businesses, 1,550 associations, 1,764 shops, and 1,305 service providers. The urban area has one of the largest catchment areas in Europe with more than 300,000 square metres of retail space and 469 m^{2} per thousand population against 270 on average in France. The commercial area of Avignon Nord is one of the largest in Europe.

The tertiary sector is by far the most dynamic in the department, driven largely by Vaucluse's significant production of early fruits and vegetables. The MIN (Market of National Importance) has become the pivotal hub of commercial activity in the department, taking precedence over other local markets (including that of Carpentras).

A Sensitive urban zone was created for companies wanting to relocate with exemptions from tax and social issues. It is located south of Avignon between the city walls and the Durance located in the districts of Croix Rouge, Monclar, Saint-Chamand, and La Rocade.

=== Areas of economic activity ===
There are nine main areas of economic activity in Avignon.

The Courtine area is the largest with nearly 300 businesses (of which roughly half are service establishments, one third are shops, and the rest related to industry) and more than 3,600 jobs. The site covers an area of 300 hectares and is located south-west of the city at the TGV railway station.

Then comes the Fontcouverte area with a hundred establishments representing a thousand jobs. It is, however, more oriented towards shops than the Courtine area.

The MIN area of Avignon is the Agroparc area (Note: This area has had the INRA Centre which carries out scientific research in engineering environmental management for cultivated land and forests since 1953.) (or "Technopole Agroparc"). The Cristole area is contiguous and both have a little less than a hundred establishments.

Finally, the areas of Castelette, Croix de Noves, Realpanier, and the airport each have fewer than 25 establishments spread between service activities and shops. The area of the Castelette alone represents more than 600 jobs—i.e. 100 more than Cristole.

=== Tourism ===
Four million visitors come annually to visit the city and the region and also for its Festival d'Avignon. In 2011 the most visited tourist attraction was the Palais des Papes with 572,972 paying visitors. The annual Festival d'Avignon is the most important cultural event in the city. The official festival attracted 135,800 people in 2012.

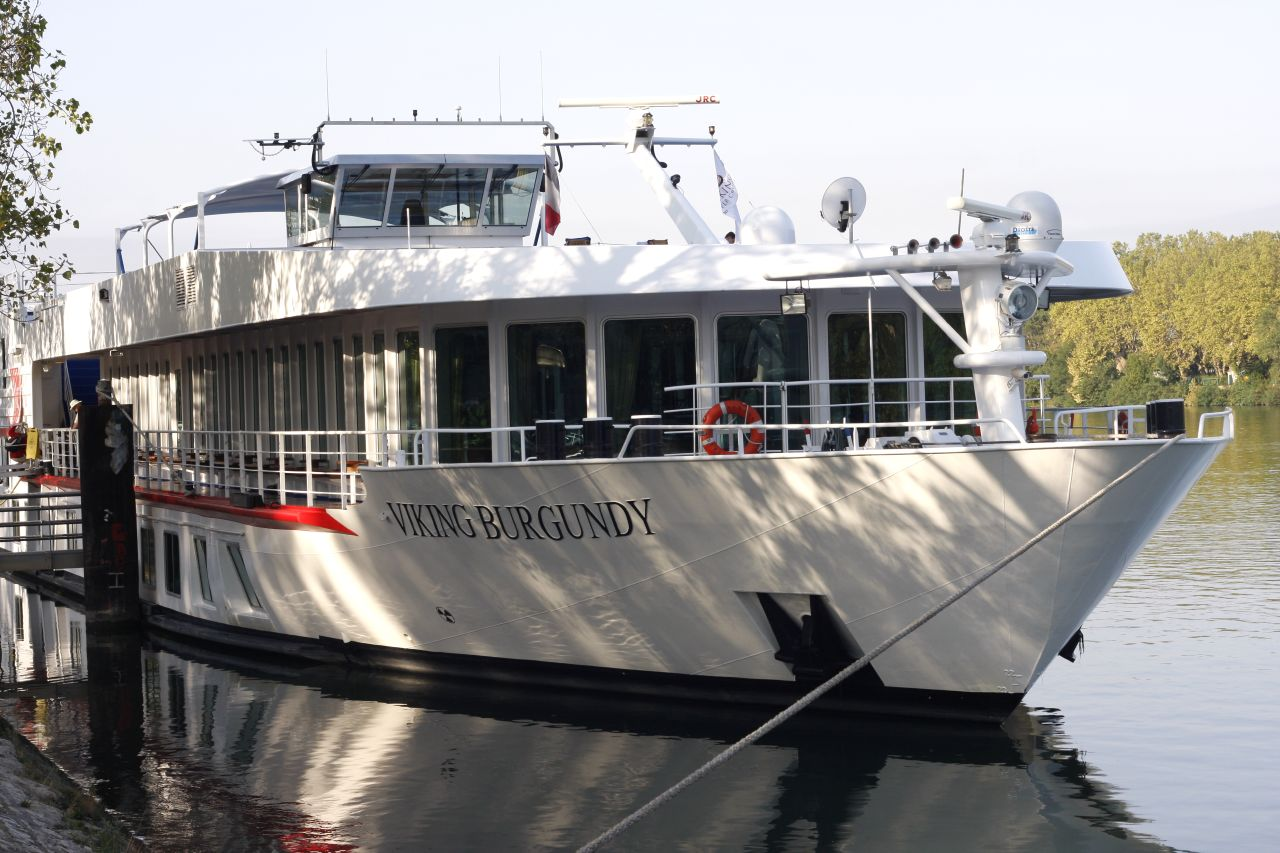
A cruise boat at the quay at Avignon.

River tourism began in 1994 with three river boat-hotels. In 2011 there is a fleet of 21 river boat-hotel vessels, including six sight-seeing boats which are anchored on the quay along the Oulle walkways. In addition, a free shuttle boat connects Avignon to the Île de la Barthelasse and, as of 1987, a harbor master has managed all river traffic.

The commune has been awarded one flower by the National Council of Towns and Villages in Bloom in the Competition of cities and villages in Bloom.

=== Agriculture ===
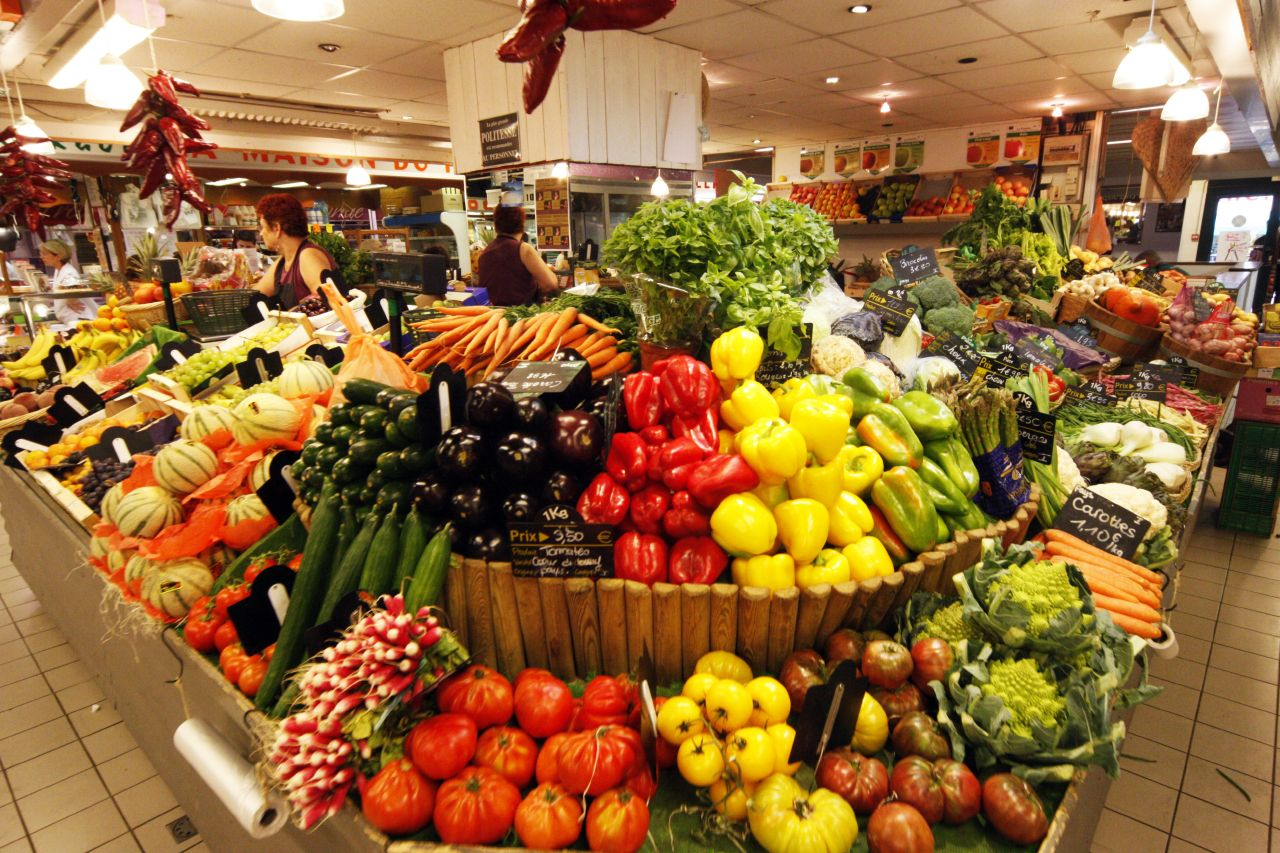
Fruit and vegetables at the markets of Avignon

The city is the headquarters of the International Association of the Mediterranean Tomato, the World Council of the Tomato Industry, and the Inter-Rhône organisation.

=== Industry ===
Only EDF (Grand Delta) with about 850 employees and Onet Propreté (Note: Cleaning company.) with just over 300 exceed 100 employees.

=== Public sector (excluding government) ===
The Henri Duffaut hospital, the City of Avignon, and the CHS of Montfavet are the largest employers in the town with about 2,000 employees each. Then comes the General Council of Vaucluse with about 1,300 employees.

=== Employment ===
In 2017 the unemployment rate was 26.0% while it was 20.7% in 2007. There are 38,731 people in the Avignon workforce: 102 (0.3%) agricultural workers, 2,194 (5.7%) tradesmen, shopkeepers, and business managers, 5,598 (14.5%) managers and intellectuals, 8,486 (21.9%) middle managers, 11,734 (30.3%) employees, and 9,247 (23.9%) workers.

== Transport ==
=== Roads ===
Avignon is close to two motorways:

- the A7 autoroute (E714) is a north–south axis on which there are two exits: 23 Avignon-Nord (Northern districts of Avignon, Le Pontet, Carpentras) and 24 Avignon-Sud (Southern districts of Avignon, Avignon-Caumont Airport);
- the A9 autoroute (E15) which branches from the A7 near Orange along a north-east south-west axis towards Spain.

The main roads are:

- Route nationale N100 which goes west to Remoulins
- The D225 which goes north towards Entraigues-sur-la-Sorgue
- The D62 which goes north-east to Vedène
- The D28 which goes east to Saint-Saturnin-lès-Avignon
- The D901 which goes south-east to Morières-lès-Avignon
- Route nationale N570 which goes south to Rognonas

The city has nine paid multi-storey car parks with a total of 7,100 spaces, multi-storey car parks under surveillance with a capacity for 2,050 cars with a free shuttle to the city centre, as well as five other free parking areas with a capacity of 900 cars.

=== Railways ===
Avignon is served by two railway stations: the historic station built in 1860, the Gare d'Avignon-Centre, just outside the city walls, which can accommodate any type of train and, since 2001, the Gare d'Avignon TGV in the Courtine district south of the city, on the LGV Méditerranée line. Since December 2013 the two stations have been connected by a link line—the Virgule. The Montfavet district, which was formerly a separate commune, also has a station.

=== Airports ===
The Avignon - Caumont Airport on the south-eastern commune border has several international routes to England. The major airport in the region with domestic and international scheduled passenger service is the Marseille Provence Airport.

=== Water transport ===
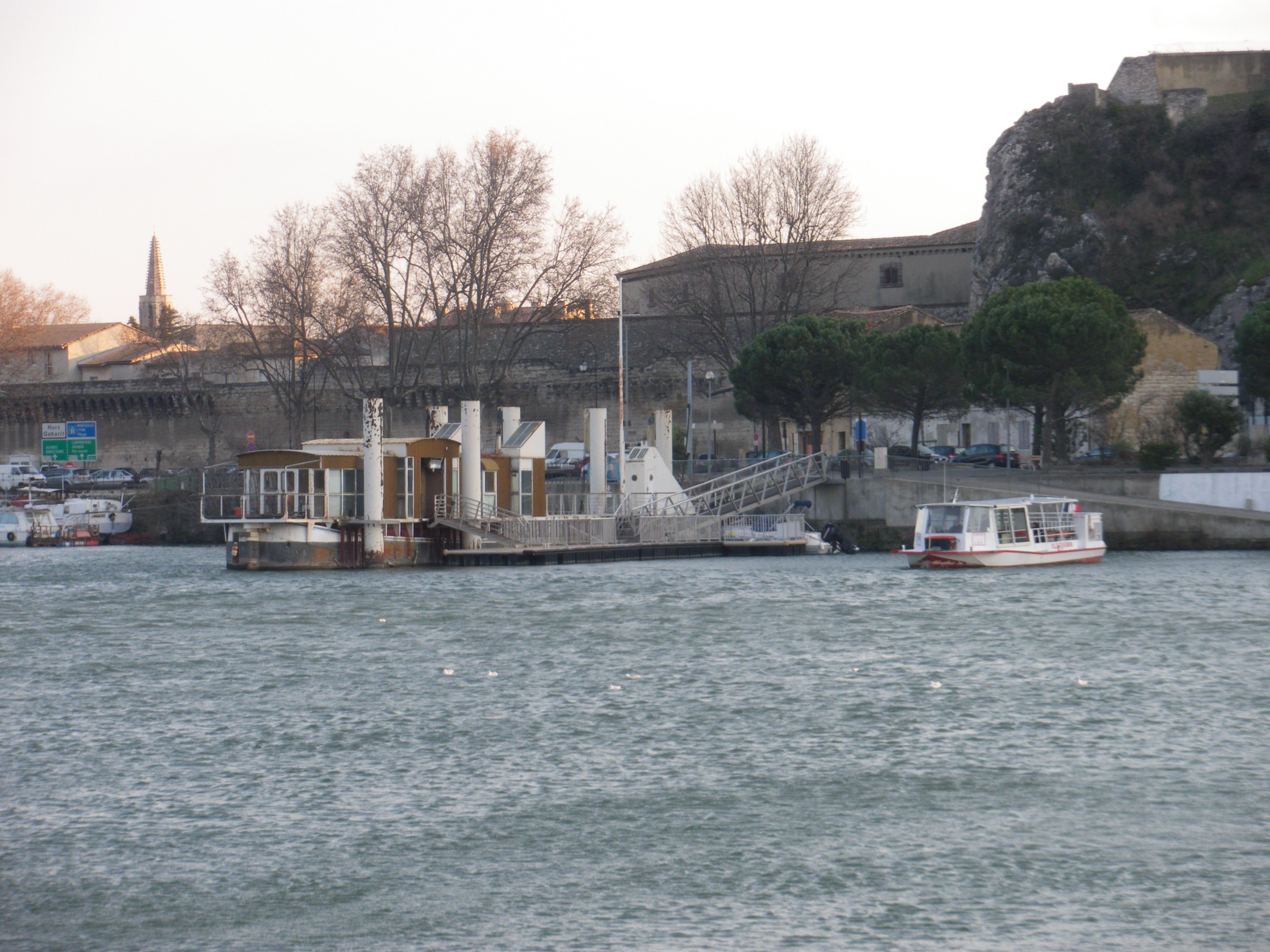
A water taxi departing from its berth

The Rhône has for many centuries been an important means of transportation for the city. River traffic in Avignon has two commercial ports, docking stations for boat cruises, and various riverfront developments. A free shuttle boat has been established between the quay near the city walls and the opposite bank (the île de la Barthelasse).

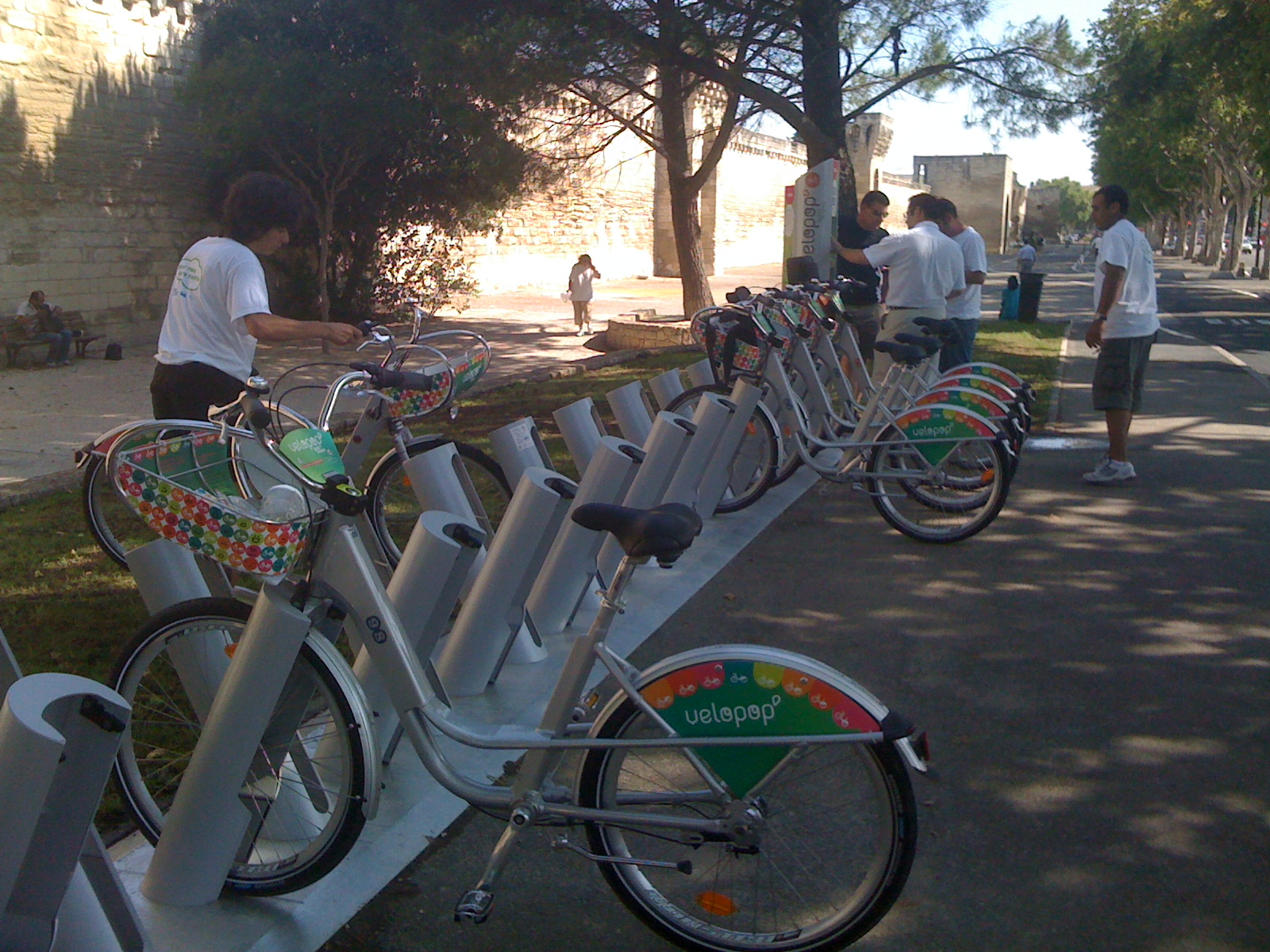
A vélopop cycle station next to the city walls

=== Public transport ===
Tecelys via the Orizo network is the public transport operator for the commune of Avignon and its surrounding suburbs. Tecelys operates bus services (including BRT named Chron'hop), as well as bike sharing and car pooling services. The Avignon tramway began operation in October 2019. The city previously had a tram system between 1901 and 1932.

=== Bicycles ===
Avignon has 110 km (68 mi) of bicycle paths. In 2009 the TCRA (former public transport operator) introduced a bicycle sharing system called the Vélopop'.

== Cultural heritage ==
Avignon has a very large number of sites and buildings (177) that are registered as historical monuments.

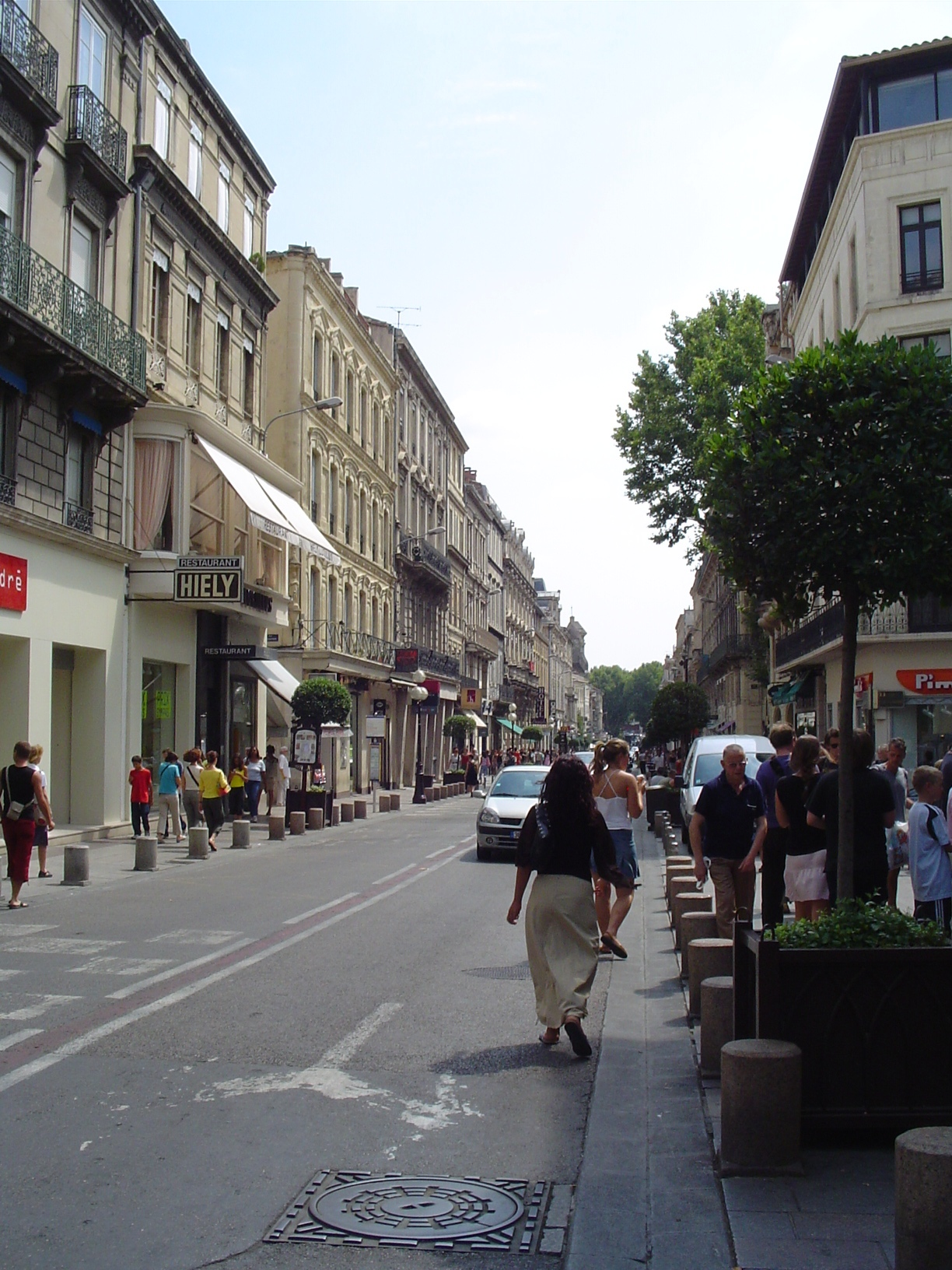
Rue de la République, the city's central boulevard

In the part of the city within the walls the buildings are old but in most areas they have been restored or reconstructed (such as the post office and the Lycée Frédéric Mistral). The buildings along the main street, Rue de la République, date from the Second Empire (1852–70) with Haussmann façades and amenities around Place de l'Horloge (the central square), the neoclassical city hall, and the theatre district.

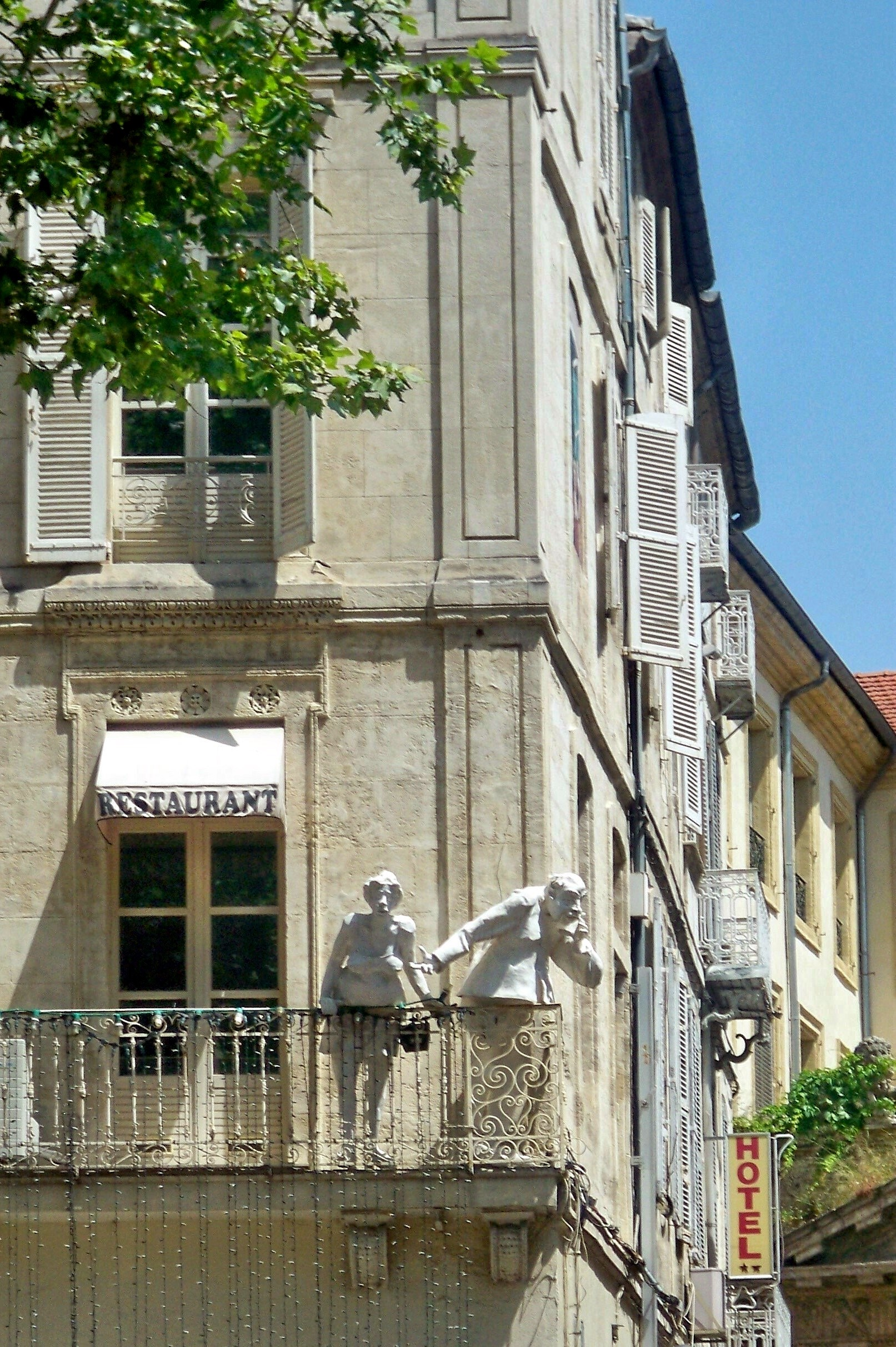
Statues gaze over the Place de l'Horloge in the town centre

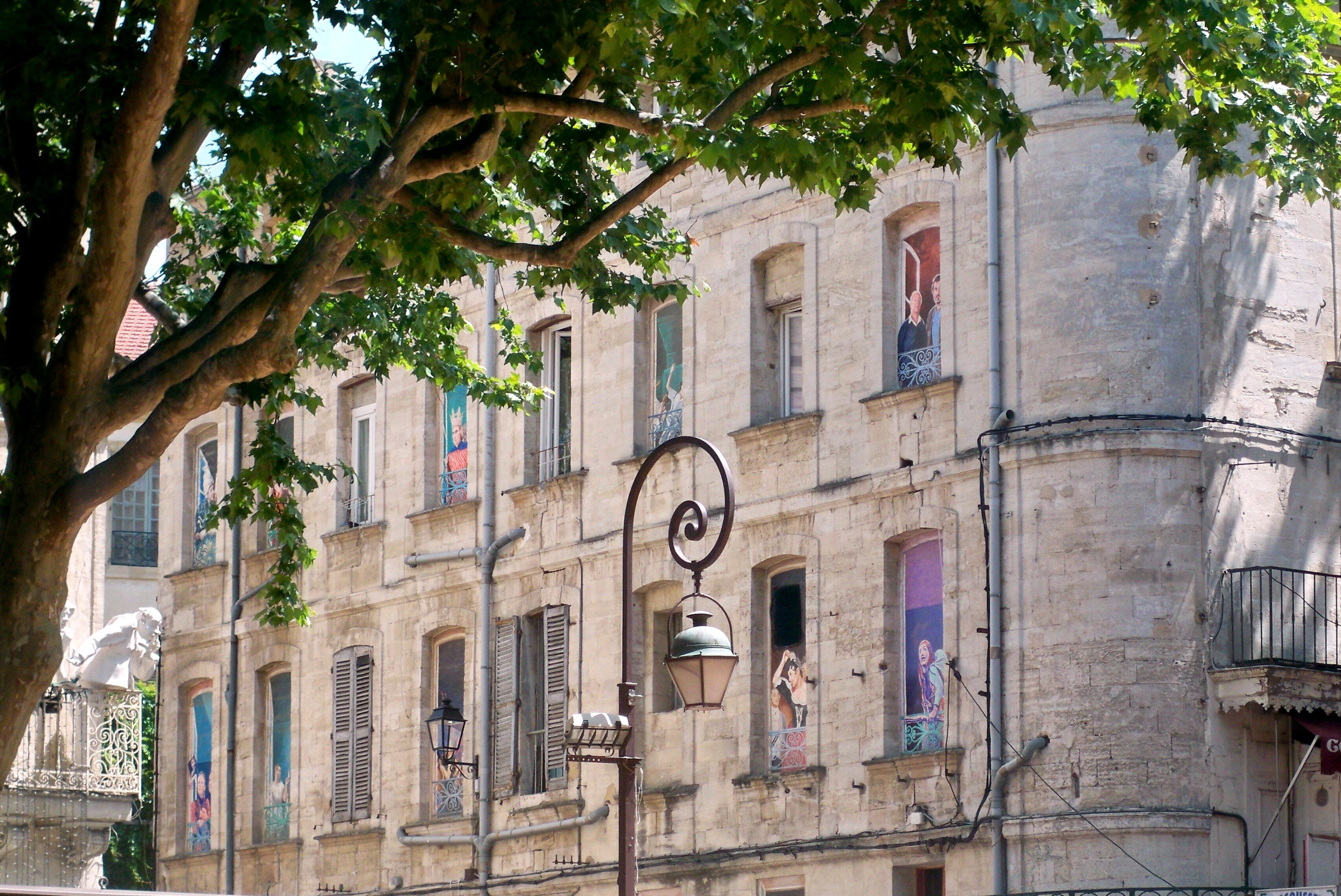
Paintings on the façades of buildings in the town centre

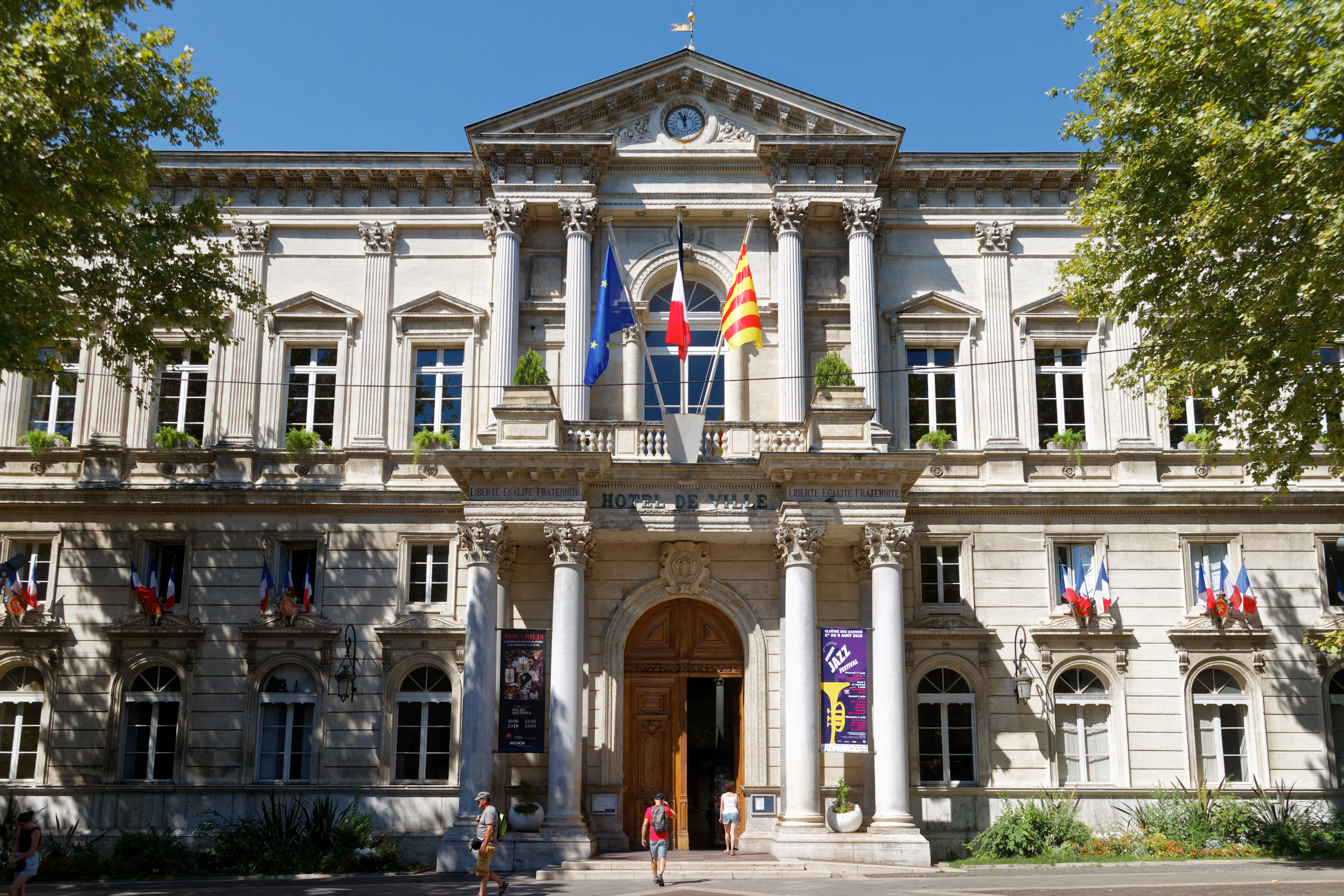
Hôtel de Ville

Listed below are the major sites of interest with those sites registered as historical monuments indicated:

- Notre Dame des Doms (12th century), the cathedral is a Romanesque building, mainly built during the 12th century; the most prominent feature of the cathedral is the 19th century gilded statue of the Virgin which surmounts the western tower. The mausoleum of Pope John XXII (1334), within the cathedral, is a noteworthy example of 14th-century Gothic carving.
- Palais des Papes ("Papal Palace") (14th century) almost dwarfs the cathedral. The palace is a monument and sits within a square of the same name. The palace was begun in 1316 by John XXII and continued by succeeding popes through the 14th century, until 1370 when it was finished.
- Minor churches of the town include three built in the Gothic architectural style:
  - Church of Saint-Pierre (14th century) which has a graceful façade and richly carved doors;
  - Church of Saint-Didier (14th century); and
  - Church of Saint-Agricol (14th century).
- Other religious buildings:
  - Church of Saint-Symphorien (14th century, former Carmelite monastery church).
  - Church of Montfavet (14th century).
  - Chapel of the Oratory.
  - Chapel of the White penitents (16th century).
  - Chapel of the Grey penitents (18th century).
  - Chapel of the Black penitents.
  - Synagogue (19th century).
- Civic buildings are represented most notably by:
  - The Hôtel de Ville (city hall) (1846), a relatively modern building with a bell tower from the 14th century,
  - The old Hôtel des Monnaies, the papal mint which was built in 1610 and became a music-school.
  - Hospital Sainte-Marthe.
  - Hotel of Saint-Priest (Hotel de Monery, 18th century).
  - House of King René (15th century).
- The city walls, built by the popes in the 14th century and still encircle Avignon. They are one of the finest examples of medieval fortification in existence. The walls are of great strength and are surmounted by machicolated battlements flanked at intervals by 39 massive towers and pierced by several gateways, three of which date from the 14th century. The walls were restored under the direction of Eugène Viollet-le-Duc.
- Bridges include:
  - The Pont Saint-Bénézet, better known as the Pont d'Avignon and for the French song Sur le pont d'Avignon. Only four of the twenty one piers are left and the bridge ends mid-channel. On one of the piers stands the small Romanesque chapel of Saint-Bénézet.
  - The Pont Édouard Daladier and the Pont de Royaume, which together span both channels of the Rhone leading to Villeneuve-lès-Avignon, thus replacing the Pont Saint-Bénézet
  - The Pont de l'Europe, which provides a second road crossing over the Rhone.
  - Two railway bridges over the Rhone, one carrying the conventional Paris–Marseille line and the other the LGV Méditerranée line
  - Pont de Rognonas, across the Durance, in the south of the city
- Calvet Museum, so named after Esprit Calvet, a physician who in 1810 left his collections to the town. It has a large collection of paintings, metalwork and other objects. The library has over 140,000 volumes.
- The town has a Statue of Jean Althen, who migrated from Persia and in 1765 introduced the culture of the madder plant, which long formed the staple—and is still an important tool—of the local cloth trade in the area.
- Musée du Petit Palais (opened 1976) at the end of the square overlooked by the Palais des Papes, has an exceptional collection of Renaissance paintings of the Avignon school as well as from Italy, which reunites many "primitives" from the collection of Giampietro Campana.
- The Hotel d'Europe, one of the oldest hotels in France, in business since 1799.
- The Collection Lambert, houses contemporary art exhibitions
- The Musée Angladon exhibits the paintings of a private collector who created the museum
- Musée Lapidaire, with collections of archaeological and medieval sculptures from the Fondation Calvet in the old chapel of the Jesuit College.
- Musée Louis-Vouland
- Musée Requien
- Palais du Roure
- Les Halles is a large indoor market that offers fresh produce, meats, and fish along with a variety of other goods.
- The Place Pie is a small square near Place de l'Horloge where you can partake in an afternoon coffee on the outdoor terraces or enjoy a night on the town later in the evening as the square fills with young people.
- Note: the name of Pablo Picasso's 1907 painting Les Demoiselles d'Avignon (The Young Ladies of Avignon) is misleading; Picasso's models for this painting were in fact not women of the city of Avignon, but rather of the Carrer d'Avinyó (Avignon Street) in Barcelona.

The commune houses more than 500 historical objects, many of which are religious.

=== Gallery ===
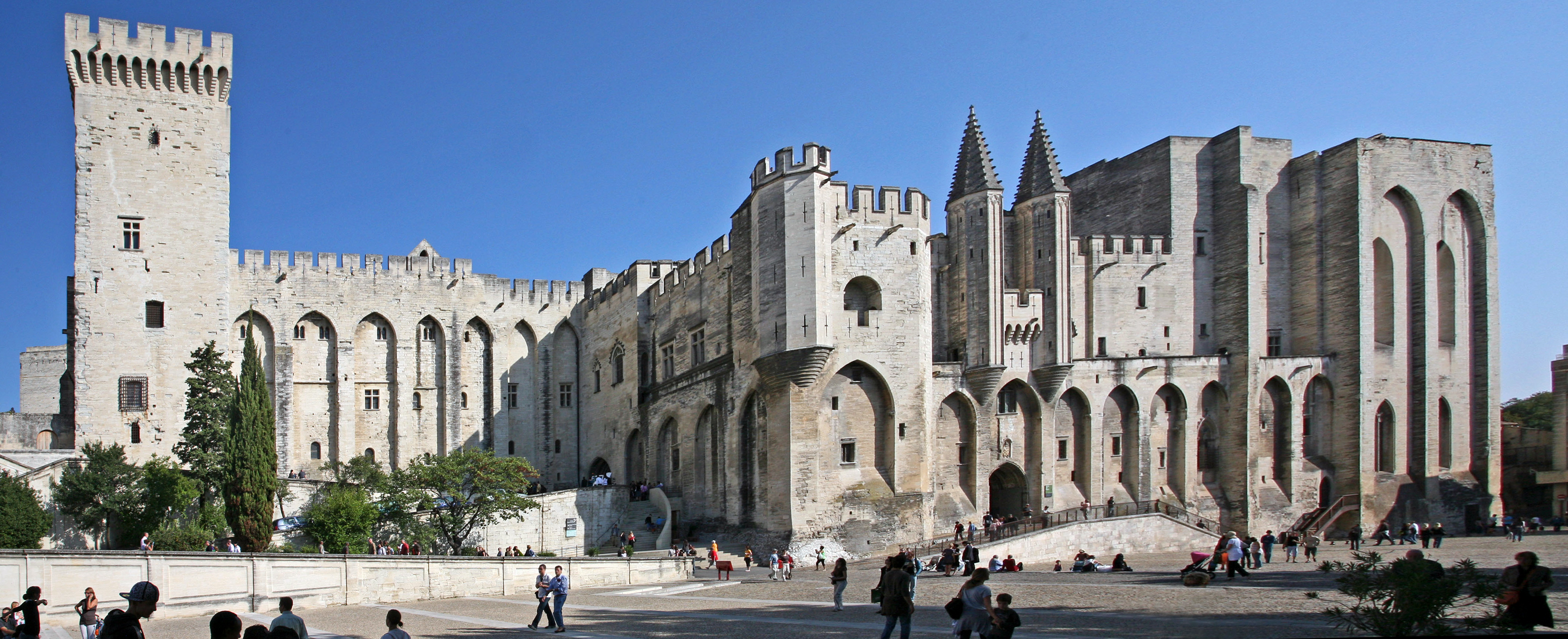
View of the Palais des Papes from the square on the western side

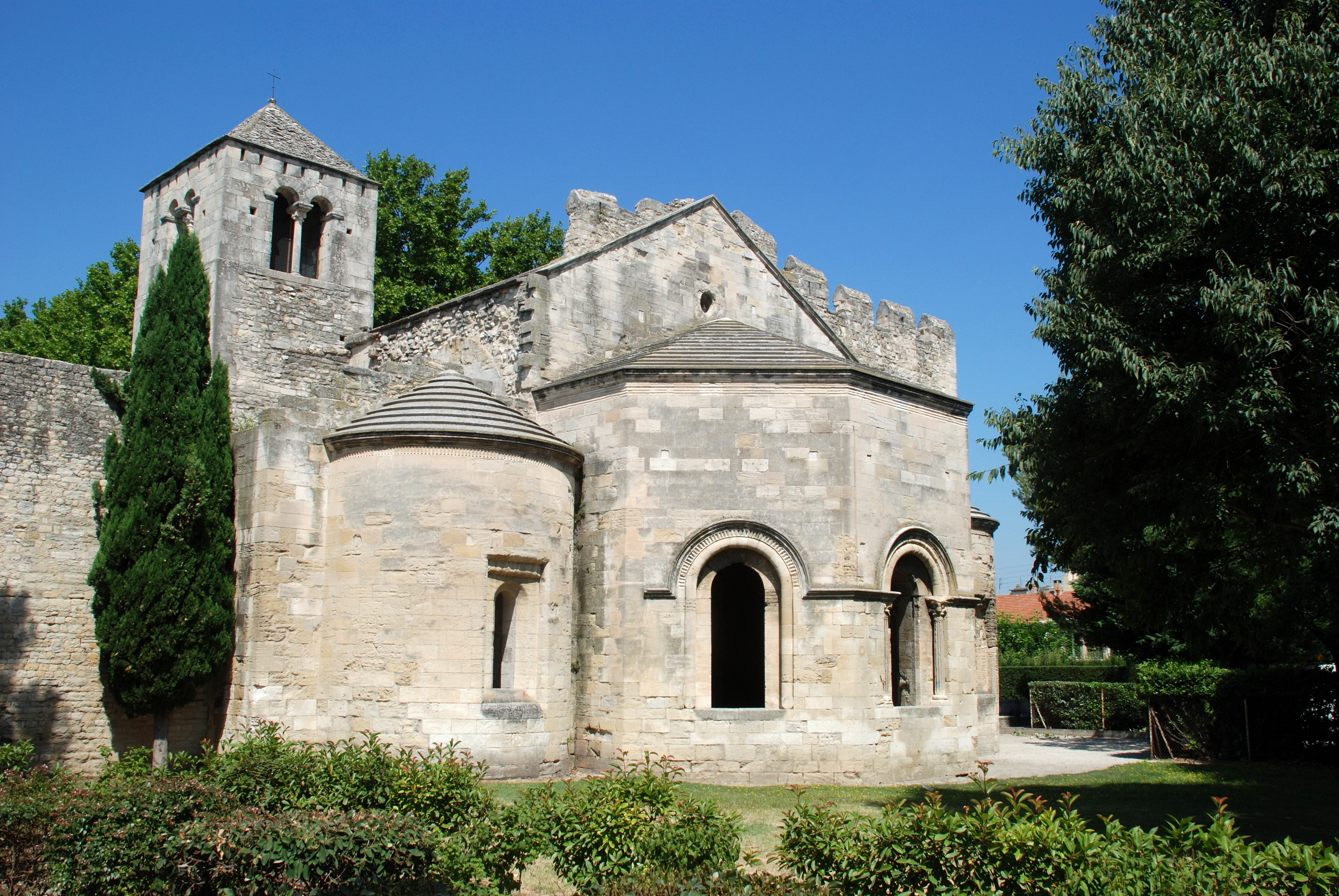
Abbey of Saint-Ruf

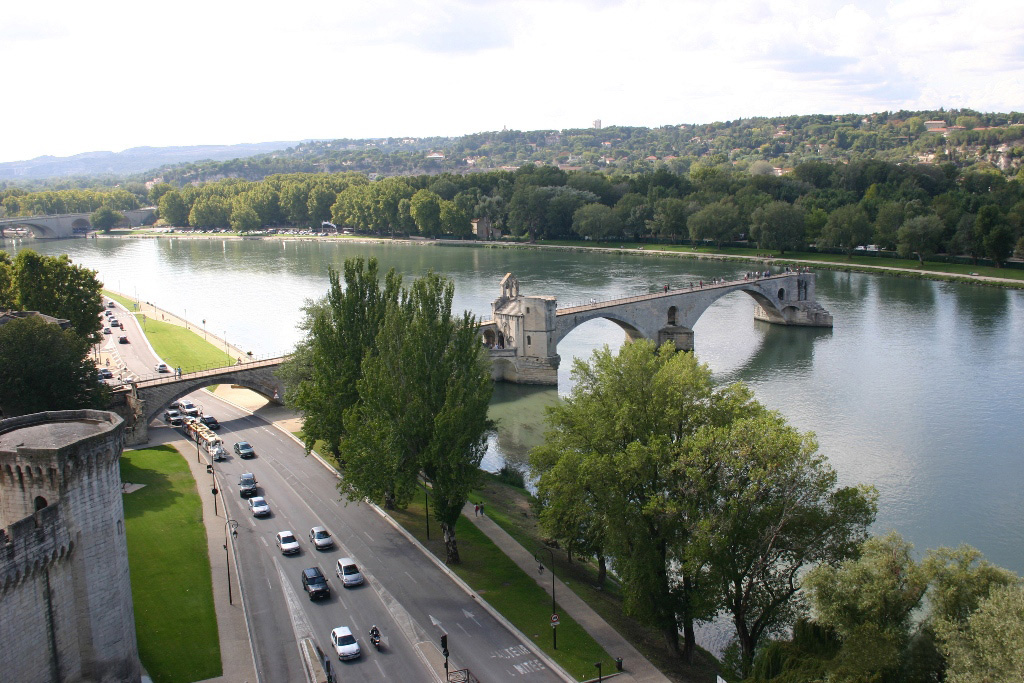
The Pont d'Avignon from the song "Sur le Pont d'Avignon"

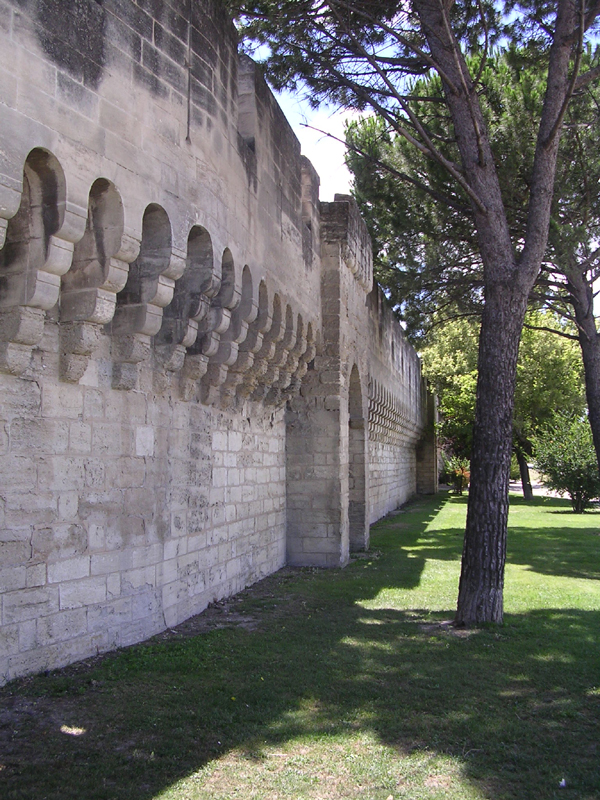
The city walls of Avignon

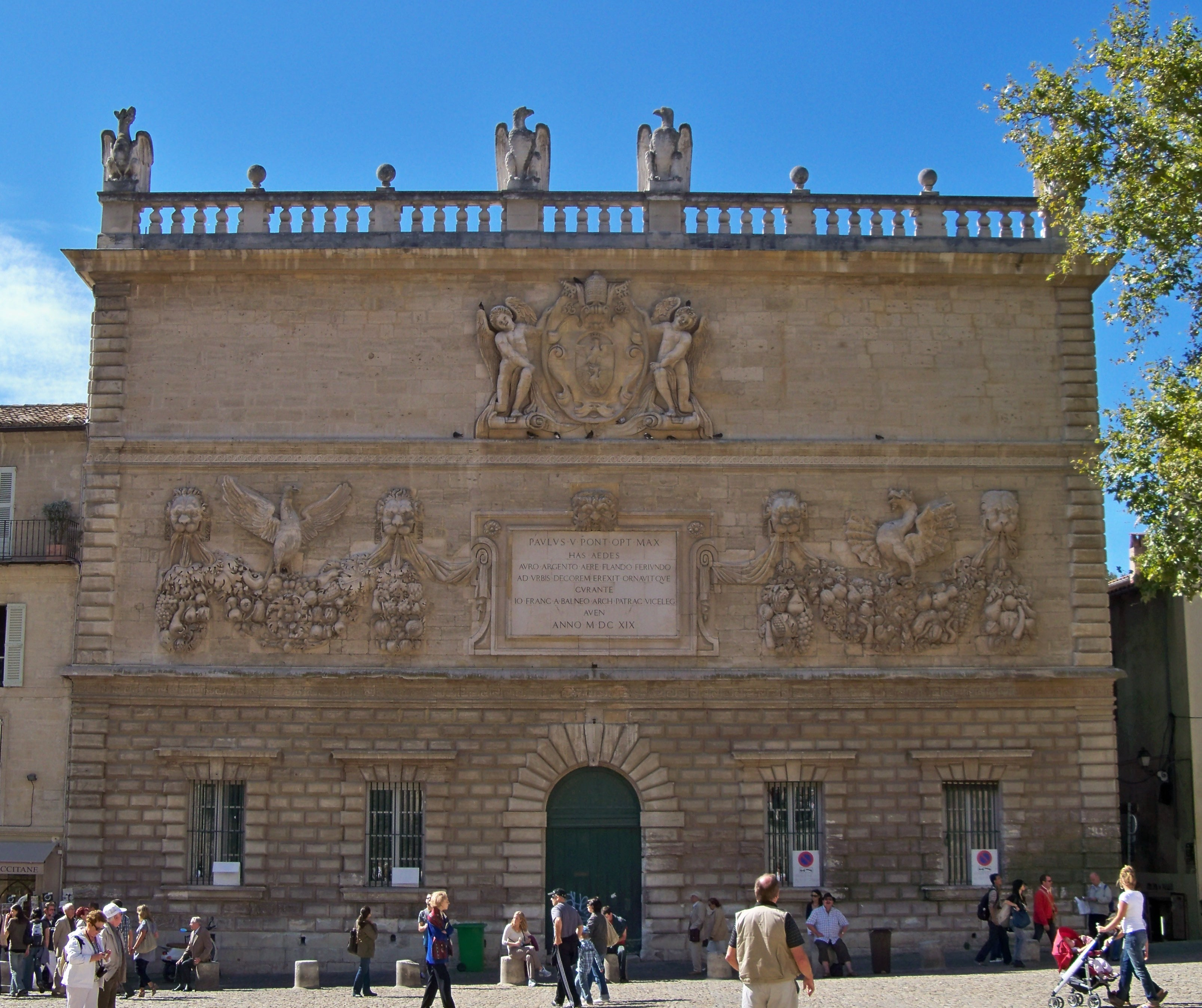
The Hôtel des Monnaies

== Culture ==
=== Avignon Festival ===
A theatre festival is held annually in Avignon. Founded in 1947, the Festival d'Avignon (Avignon Festival) comprises traditional theatrical events as well as other art forms such as dance, music, and cinema, making use of the town's historical monuments. Every summer approximately 100,000 people attend the festival. There are really two festivals that take place: the more formal "Festival In", which presents plays inside the Palace of the Popes and the more bohemian "Festival Off", which is known for its presentation of largely undiscovered plays and street performances.

Avignon festival was founded by Jean Vilar. This cultural initiative brought, year after year, a major economic boost to the city and to the region of Provence. Indeed, the tourists visiting Avignon during the month of July usually take benefit of their presence to go to the smaller villages around, to discover the local food, local wines, touristic activities, learn some French.

=== International Congress Centre ===
The centre was created in 1976 within the premises of the Palace of the Popes and hosts many events throughout the entire year. The Congress Centre, designed for conventions, seminars, and meetings for 10 to 550 persons, now occupies two wings of the Popes' Palace.

=== "Sur le Pont d'Avignon" ===
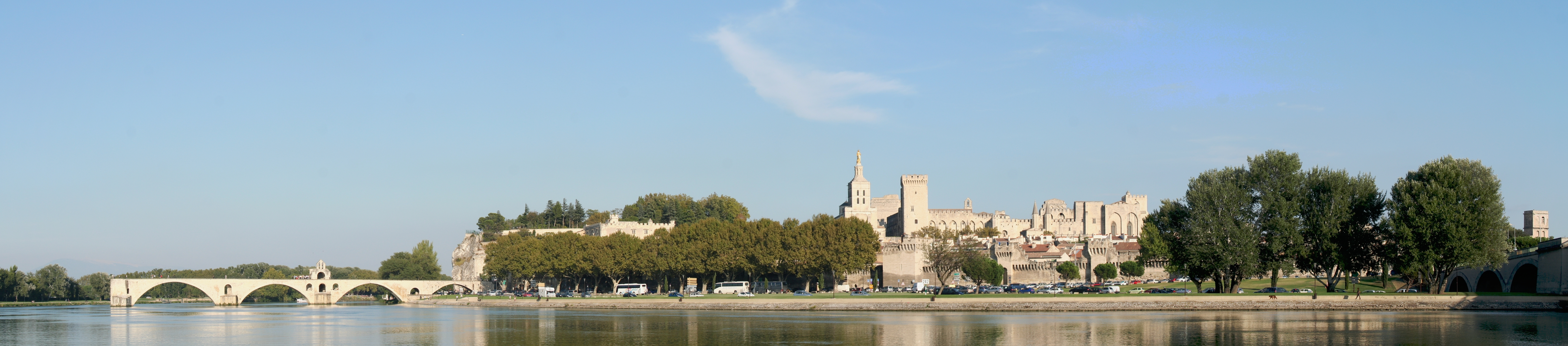
View over the Rhône looking northeast, with the Pont Saint-Bénézet or "Pont d'Avignon" at left

Avignon is commemorated by the French song 'Sur le Pont d'Avignon' ('On the bridge of Avignon'), which describes folk dancing. The song dates from the mid-19th century when Adolphe Adam included it in the Opéra comique Le Sourd ou l'Auberge Pleine, which was first performed in Paris in 1853. The opera was an adaptation of the 1790 comedy by Desforges.

The bridge of the song is the Pont Saint-Bénézet over the Rhône, of which only four arches (out of the initial 22) now remain. A bridge across the Rhone was built between 1171 and 1185, with a length of some 900 metres (3,000 ft), but was destroyed during the siege of Avignon by Louis VIII of France in 1226. It was rebuilt but suffered frequent collapses during floods and had to be continually repaired. Several arches were already missing (and spanned by wooden sections) before the remainder was abandoned in 1669.

== Sport ==
Sporting Olympique Avignon is the local rugby league football team. During the 20th century it produced a number of French international representative players.

AC Arles-Avignon was a professional association football team. They competed in Ligue 2, after the 2010–2011 season competing in Ligue 1 and being relegated back down the following season and ultimately folding in 2016. They played at the Parc des Sports, which has a capacity of just over 17,000.

== Education ==
The schools within the commune of Avignon are administered by the Académie d'Aix-Marseille. There are 26 state nursery schools (Écoles maternelles) for children up to 6, and 32 state primary schools (Écoles élémentaires) up to 11. There are also 4 private schools.

=== University of Avignon ===
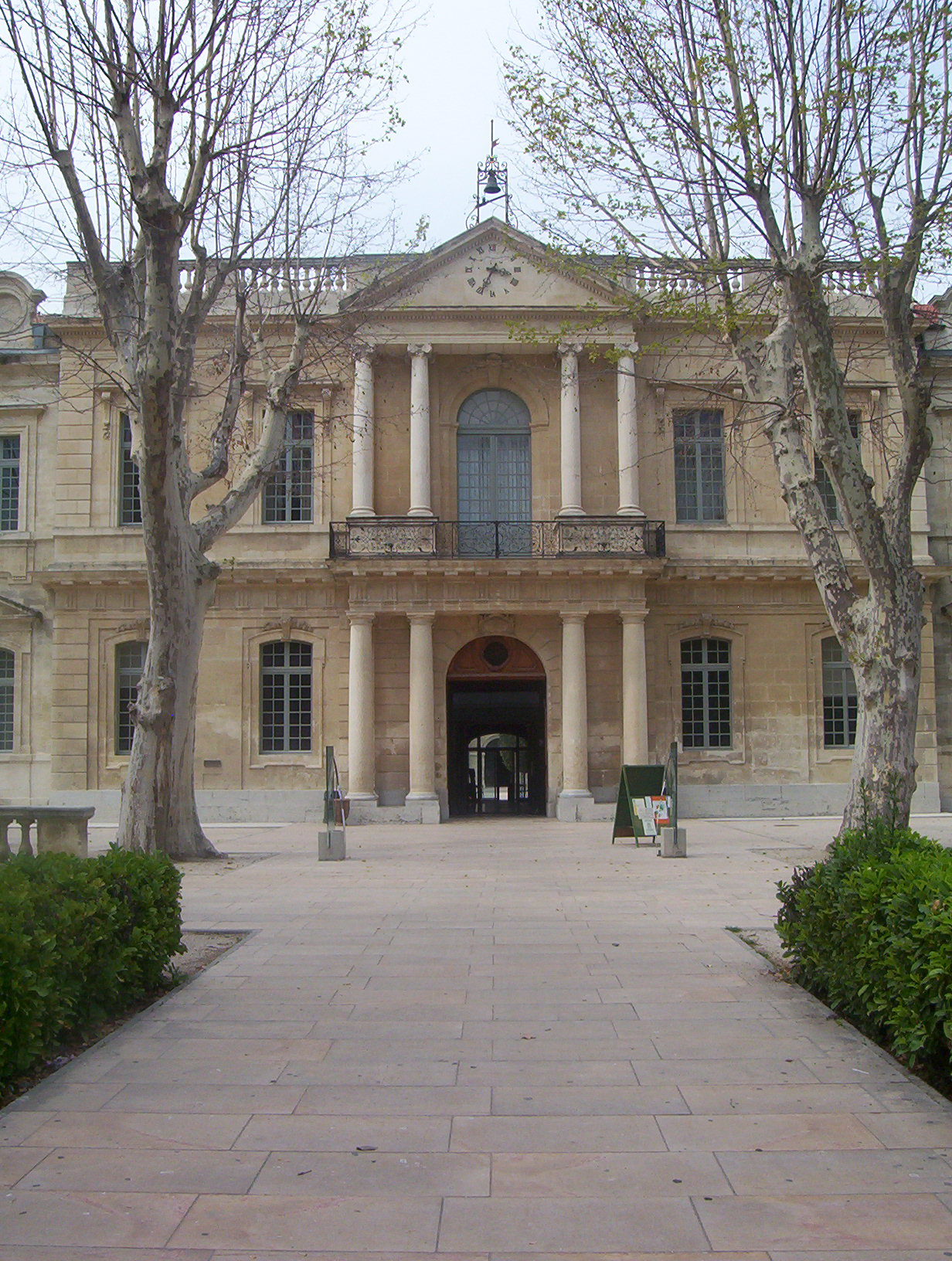
Entrance to the main university building. This 18th century portico was once the entrance to the Hôpital Sainte-Marthe.

==== University before the Revolution ====
The medieval University of Avignon, formed from the existing schools of the city, was formally constituted in 1303 by Boniface VIII in a Papal Bull. Boniface VIII and King Charles II of Naples were the first great protectors and benefactors to the university. The Law department was the most important department covering both civil and ecclesiastical law. The law department existed nearly exclusively for some time after the university's formation and remained its most important department throughout its existence.

In 1413 Pope John XXIII founded the university's department of theology, which for quite some time had only a few students. It was not until the 16th and 17th centuries that the school developed a department of medicine. The bishop of Avignon was chancellor of the university from 1303 to 1475. After 1475 the bishop became an archbishop but remained chancellor of the university. The papal vice-legate, generally a bishop, represented the civil power (in this case the pope) and was chiefly a judicial officer who ranked higher than the Primicerius (Rector).

The Primicerius was elected by the Doctors of Law. In 1503 the Doctors of Law had 4 Theologians and in 1784 two Doctors of Medicine added to their ranks. Since the Pope was the spiritual head and, after 1348, the temporal ruler of Avignon, he was able to have a great deal of influence in all university affairs. In 1413 John XXIII granted the university extensive special privileges, such as university jurisdiction and tax exempt status. Political, geographical, and educational circumstances in the latter part of the university's existence caused it to seek favour from Paris rather than Rome for protection. During the chaos of the French Revolution the university started to gradually disappear and, in 1792, the university was abandoned and closed.

==== Modern university ====
A university annex of the Faculté des Sciences d'Aix-Marseille was opened in Avignon in 1963. Over the next 20 years various changes were made to the provision of tertiary education in the town until finally in 1984 the Université d'Avignon et des Pays de Vaucluse was created. This was nearly 200 years after the demise of the original Avignon university. The main campus lies to the east of the city centre within the city walls. The university occupies the 18th century buildings of the Hôpital Sainte-Marthe. The main building has an elegant façade with a central portico. The right hand side was designed by Jean-Baptiste Franque and built between 1743 and 1745. Franque was assisted by his son François in the design of the portico. The hospital moved out in the 1980s and, after major works, the building opened for students in 1997. In 2009–2010 there were 7,125 students registered at the university.

== Notable people ==
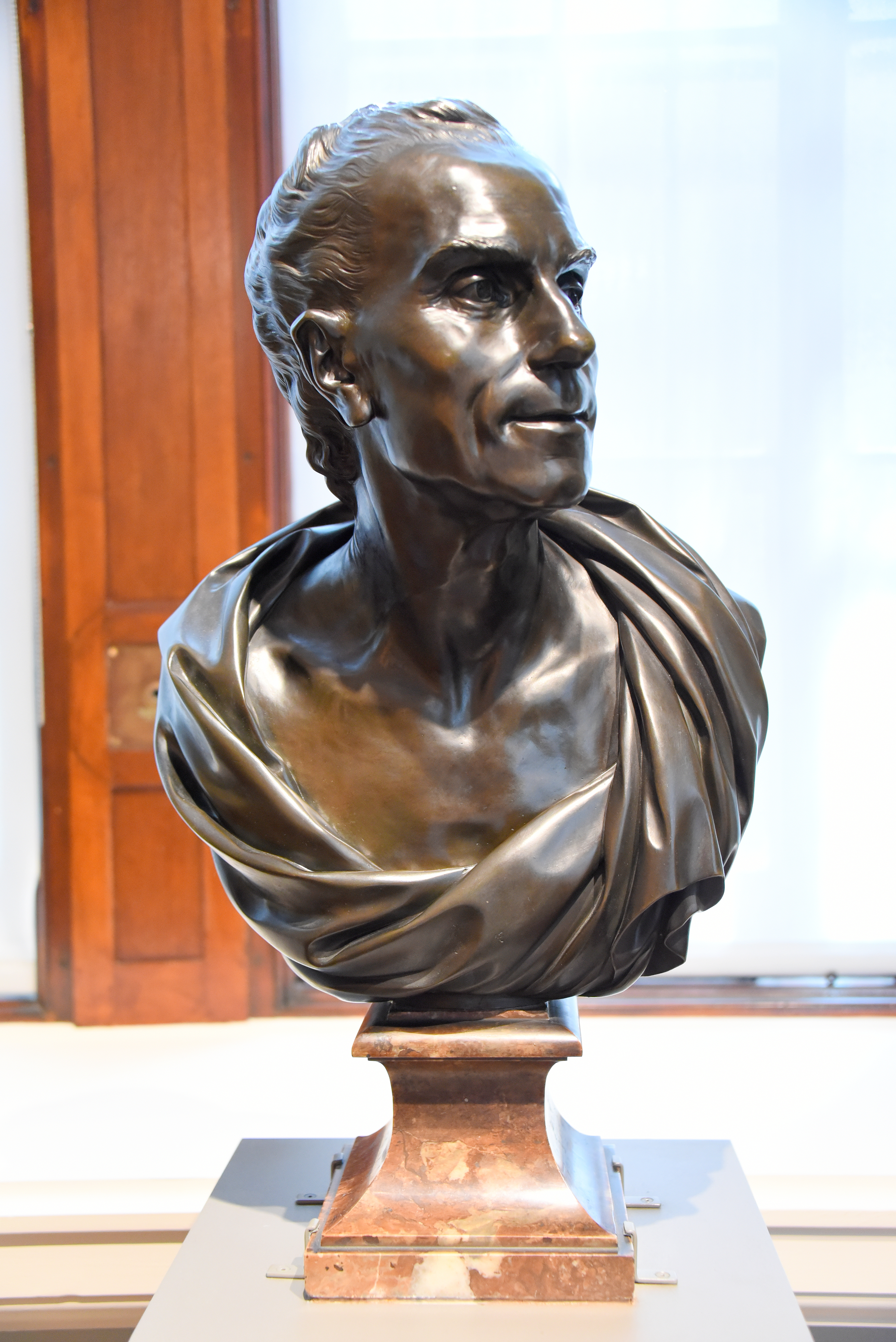
Bust of Claude-Joseph Vernet, 1783

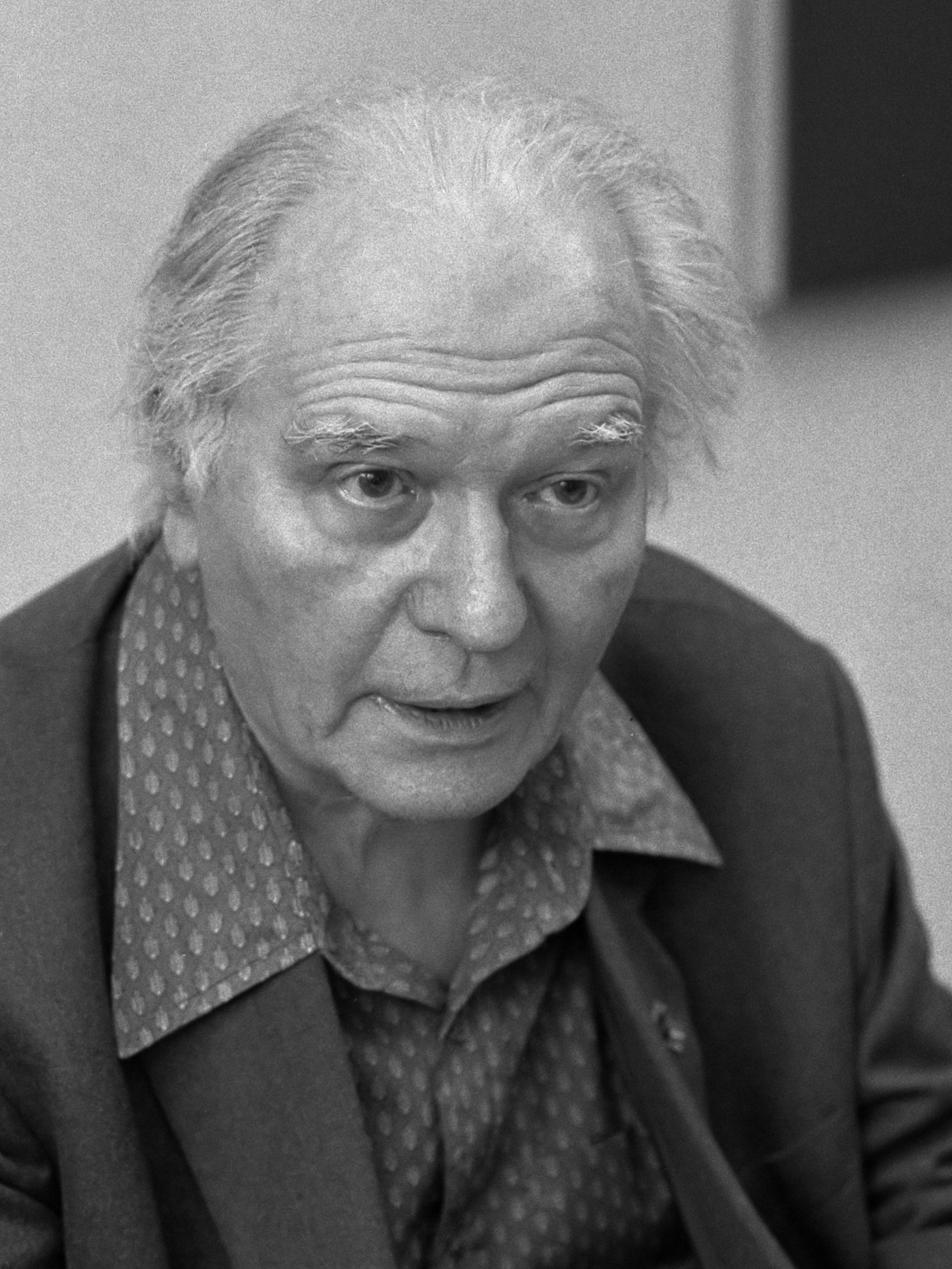
Olivier Messiaen, 1986

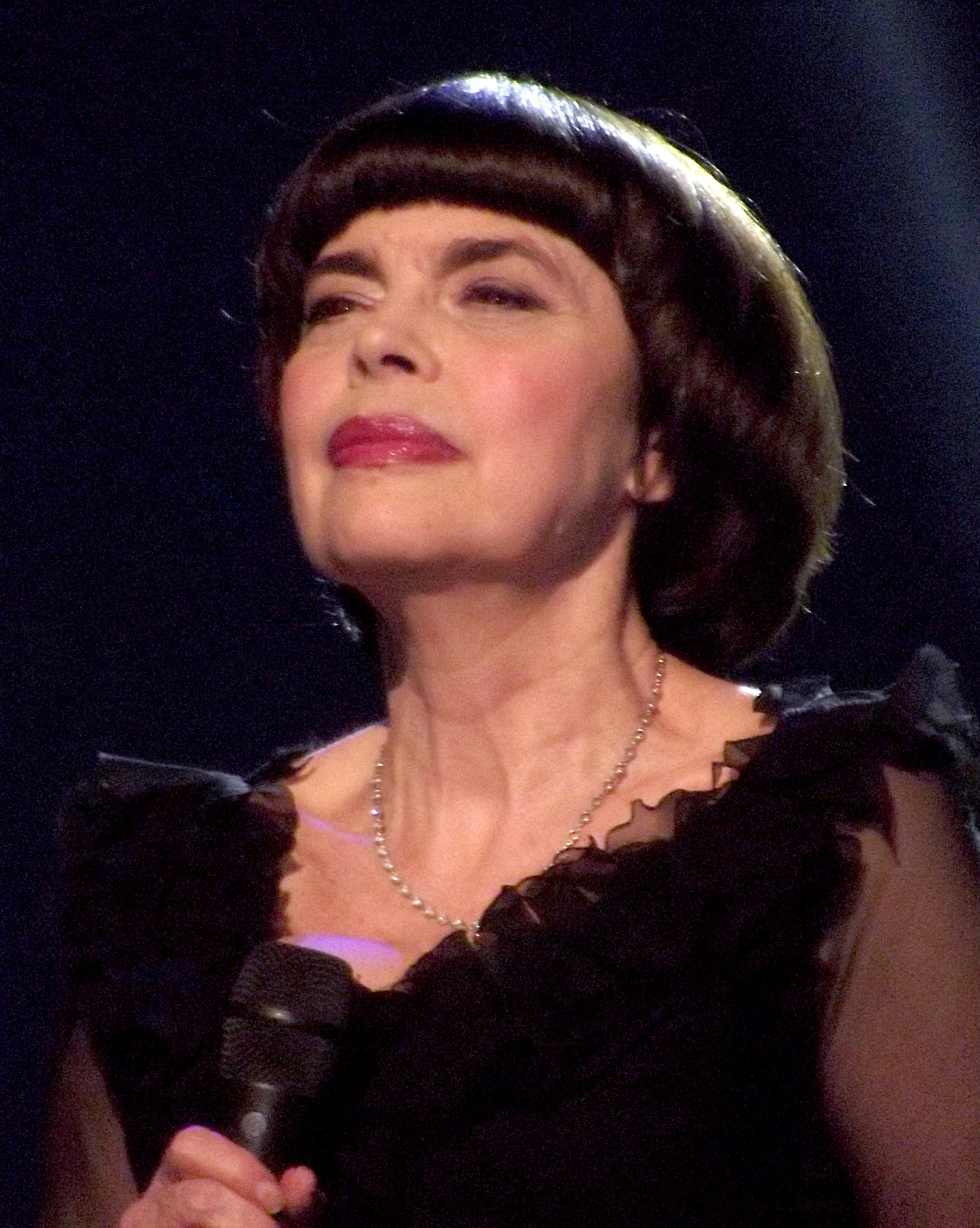
Mireille Mathieu, 2014

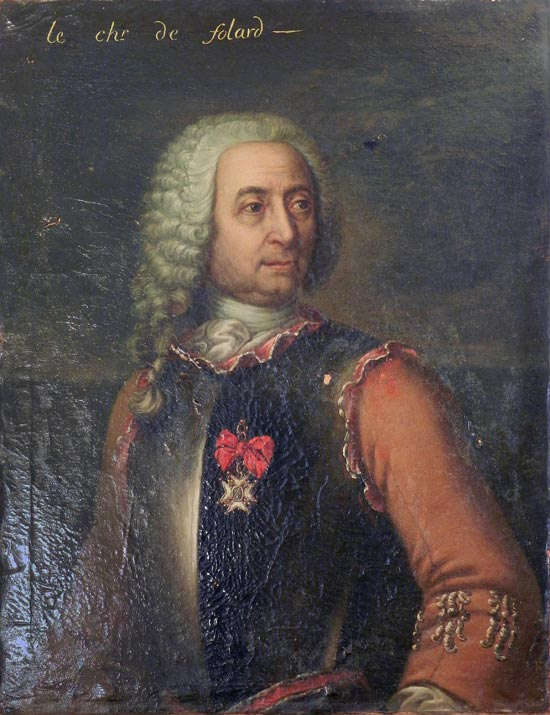
Chevalier de Folard

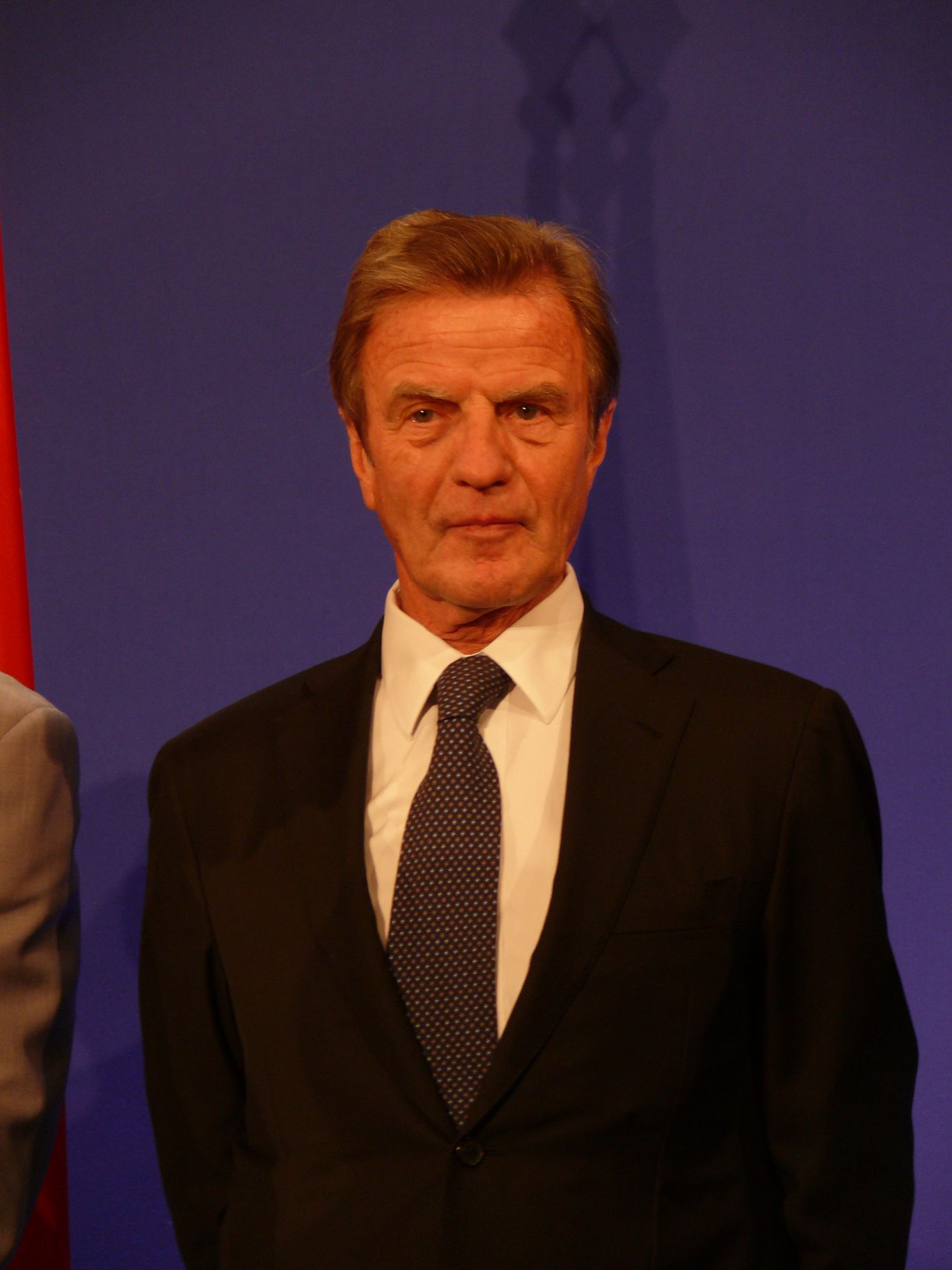
Bernard Kouchner, 2010

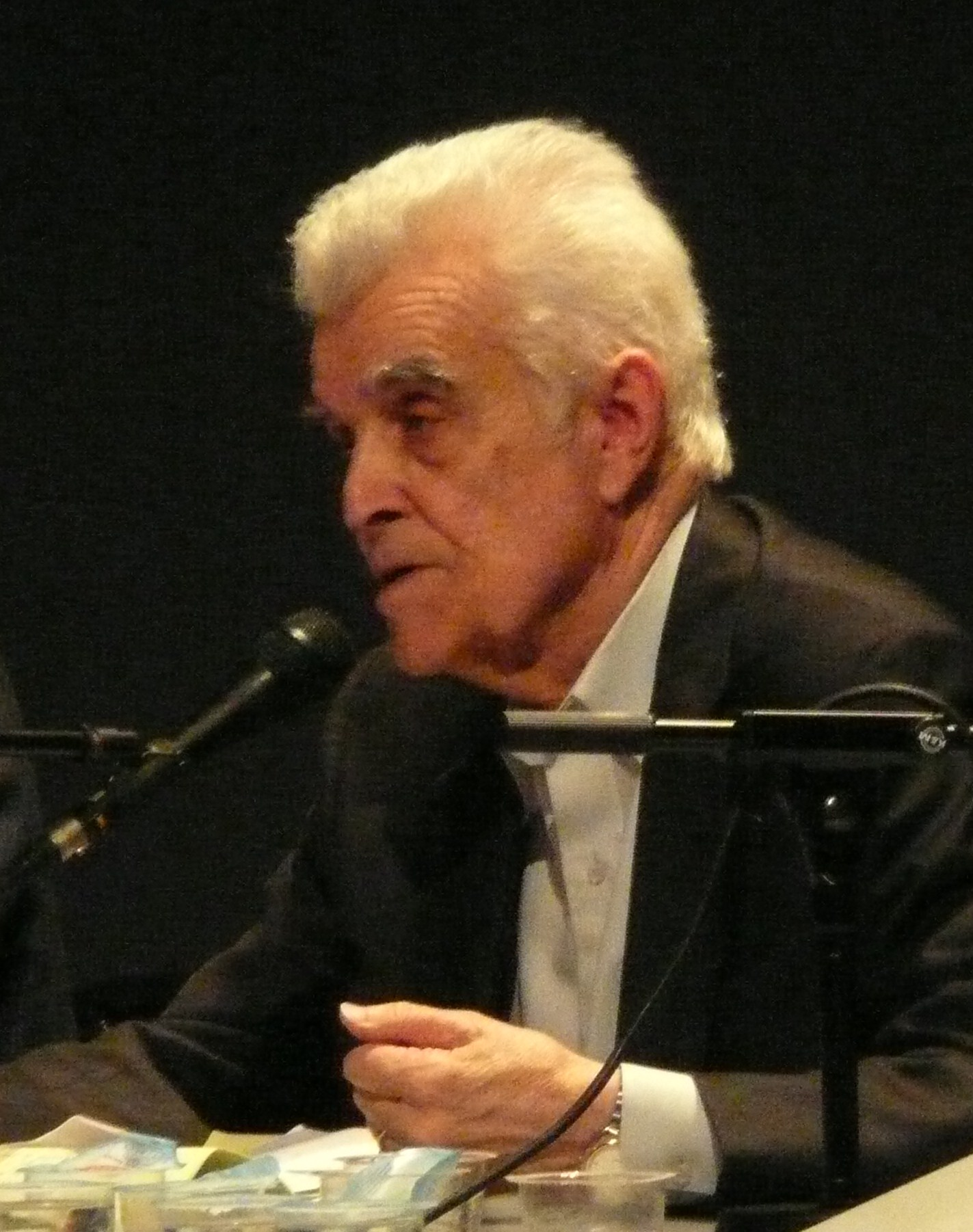
René Girard, 2007

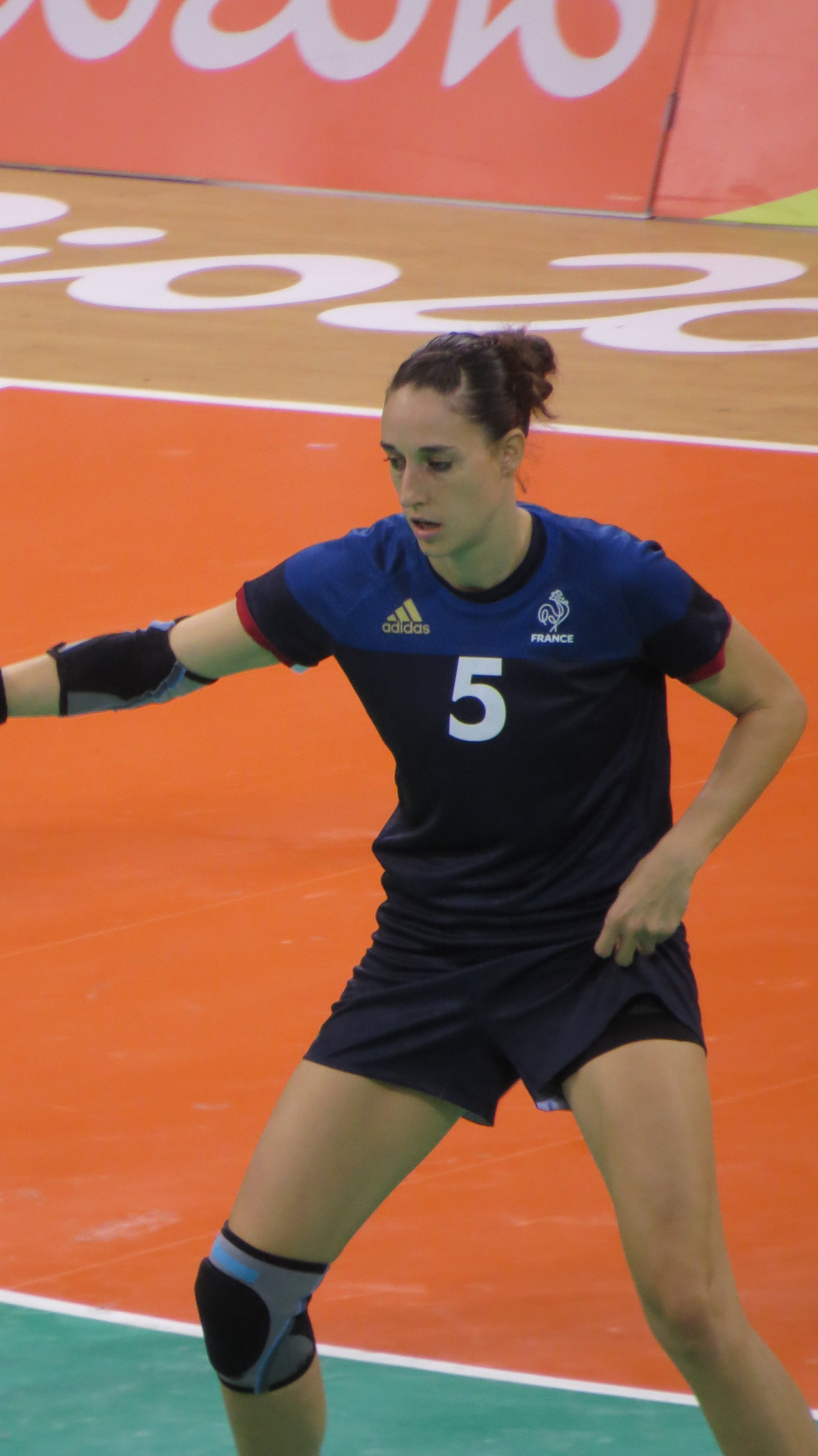
Camille Ayglon, Rio 2016

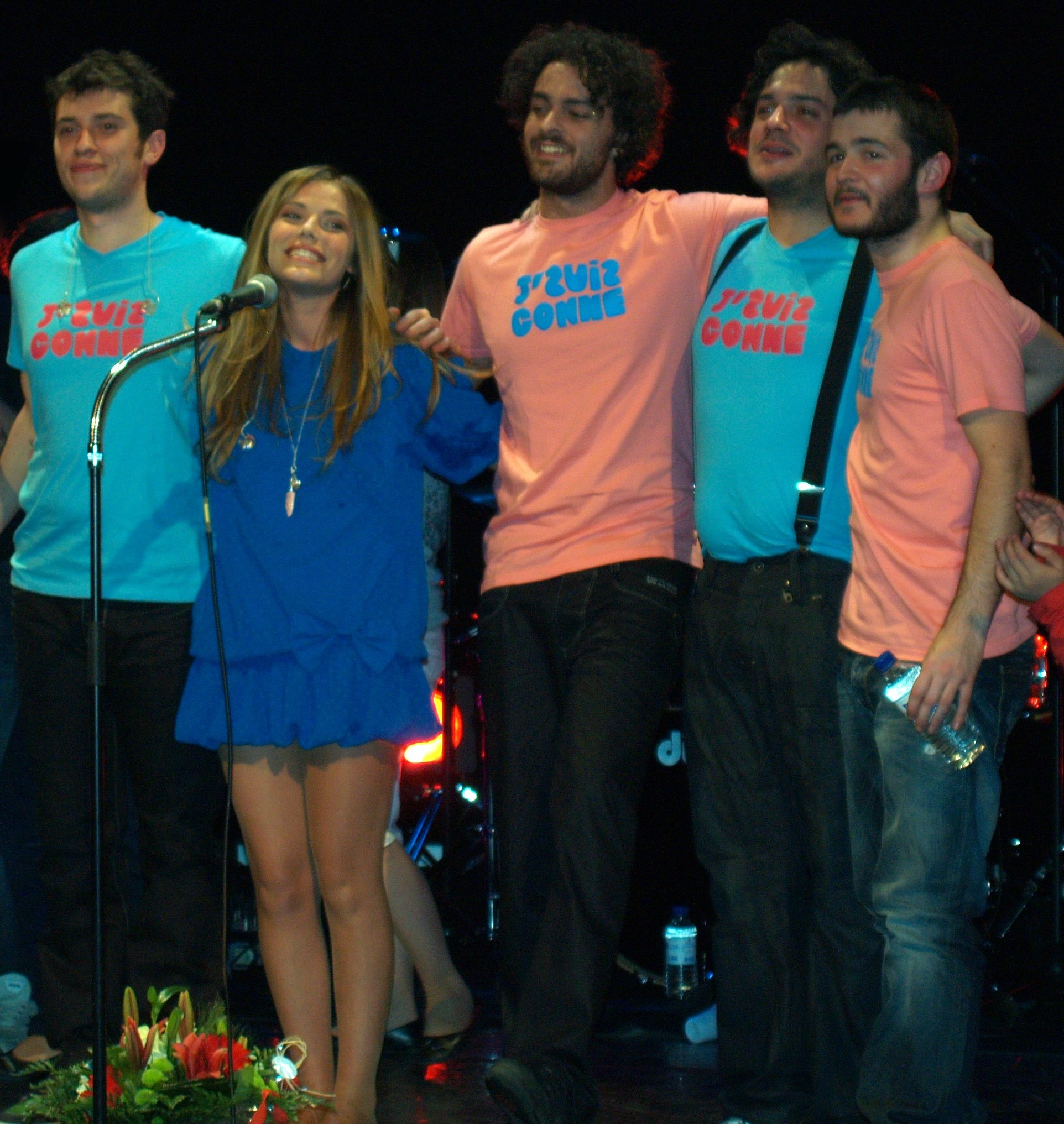
Emma Daumas,2009

=== The Arts ===
- Nicolas Dipre (c. 1495-1532), early Renaissance painter.
- Trophime Bigot (1579 in Arles – 1650 in Avignon), French painter of the Baroque era.
- Pierre Simon Jaillot (1631–1681), sculptor of ivory objects
- Pierre Parrocel (1664–1739), painter of the late-Baroque period.
- Claude-Joseph Vernet (1714–1789), a painter of night landscapes.
- Dorothea von Rodde-Schlözer (1770 in Göttingen – 1825 in Avignon), artist and scholar.
- Pierre Grivolas (1823–1906), painter of landscapes, portraits and genre scenes.
- Émile Beaussier (1874–1943), painter of maritime scenes and sunny landscapes.
- Albert Gleizes (1881–1953), artist, theoretician, philosopher, self-proclaimed founder of Cubism
- Yahel Chirinian (born 1970), contemporary sculptor and installation artist

=== Music ===
- Justine Favart (1727–1772), an operatic singer, actress, playwright and dancer.
- Albert Guille (1854–1914), operatic tenor
- Emma Daumas (born 1983) , French singer,
- Marie Grisier-Montbazon (1859−1922), a French actress and singer.
- Olivier Messiaen (1908–1992), composer, organist, and ornithologist
- Jean-Claude Malgoire (1940–2018), oboist and later conductor.
- Mireille Mathieu (born 1946), singer
- Christophe Rousset (born 1961), harpsichordist and conductor of Baroque music
- Peste Noire (formed 2000), a black metal band

=== Science & Business ===
- Procopius Waldvogel (15th C.), a medieval printer and silversmith by trade.
- Alexis-Hubert Jaillot (1632–1712), geographer and cartographer
- Pierre-Esprit Radisson (1636/1640–1710), fur trader and explorer
- Esprit Pézenas (1692–1776), Jesuit astronomer, hydrographer and mathematician
- Honoré Blanc (1736–1801), gunsmith, pioneered the use of interchangeable parts.
- Yves Delage (1854–1920), zoologist, worked on invertebrate physiology and anatomy.
- Christine Ourmières-Widener (born 1964), CEO of TAP Air Portugal.

=== Public service & the Church ===
- Pope Gregory XI (ca.1329 – 1378), the seventh and last Avignon pope.
- Francis Lambert (ca.1486 – 1530), a Protestant reformer.
- Georges d'Armagnac (ca.1501 – 1585), humanist, patron of arts, Cardinal and diplomat
- Alexandre de Rhodes (1591–1664), Jesuit missionary.
- Chevalier de Folard (1669–1752), soldier and military theorist, championed infantry columns
- Louis des Balbes de Berton de Crillon (1717–1796), Captain general of the Army.
- Étienne-Antoine Boulogne (1747–1825), cleric, Bishop of Troyes, 1809–1825.
- Pierre Louis Jean Casimir de Blacas (1771–1839), antiquarian, nobleman and diplomat
- Joseph Agricol Viala (1778–1793), child hero in the French Revolutionary Army, killed aged 15
- John Stuart Mill (1806 – 1873 in Avignon), an English philosopher, political economist and MP; he is buried in the local cemetery.
- Édouard Daladier (1884–1970), politician and 3 x pre-war Prime Minister of France
- Bernard Kouchner (born 1939), politician and doctor, co-founded Médecins Sans Frontières
- Edmond Alphandéry (born 1943), politician, public-sector company executive
- Muriel Casals i Couturier (1945–2016), a Catalan economist and academic

=== Writing ===
- Bertran Folcon d'Avignon (fl. 1202–1233), a Provençal nobleman, troubadour and poet
- Abraham Farissol (ca.1451 – ca.1525), a Jewish-Italian geographer, cosmographer, scribe and polemicist.
- Marianne-Agnès Falques (1720–1785), author of romance novels and other topical writing
- Armand de Pontmartin (1811–1890), journalist, critic and man of letters.
- Henri Bosco (1888–1976), writer, nominated for the Nobel Prize in Literature four times.
- Pierre Boulle (1912–1994), author of the novels: The Bridge over the River Kwai and Planet of the Apes
- René Girard (1923–2015), polymath, historian, literary critic and philosopher of social science
- Daniel Arsand (born 1950), writer and publisher
- Mazarine Pingeot (born 1974), writer, journalist and associate Professor of philosophy at the Paris 8 University and daughter of former French President François Mitterrand.
- Vincent Almendros (born 1978), writer, winner of the 2015 prix Françoise Sagan

=== Sport ===
- Philippe Gache (born 1962), racing driver
- Éric Di Meco (born 1963), former footballer with 342 club caps and 23 with France
- Jean Alesi (born 1964), professional racing driver for Formula 1 & DTM
- Teddy Richert (born 1974), goalkeeper coach and former goalkeeper with 464 club caps
- Jean-Christophe Ravier (born 1979), racing driver
- Cédric Carrasso (born 1981), former footballer with 379 club caps
- Philippe Toledo (born 1983), former footballer with 449 club caps
- Camille Ayglon (born 1985), retired handballer with 270 caps with France women and an Olympic team silver medallist
- Benoît Richaud (born 1988), figure skating choreographer and former competitive ice dancer.
- Benoît Paire (born 1989), tennis player, best singles ranking is World No. 18, in January 2016
- Younès Belhanda (born 1990), footballer with over 360 club caps and 58 for Morocco
- Tony Gigot (born 1990), rugby league footballer with 233 club caps and 19 for France
- Giuliano Alesi (born 1999), Super Formula driver
- Clément Novalak (born 2000), FIA Formula 2 driver
- Pierre-Louis Chovet (born 2002), racing driver

== See also ==
- Avenir Club Avignonnais, a French association football team
- Siege of Avignon (737)
- Councils of Avignon, councils of the Roman Catholic Church

== Sources ==
- Boyer, Jean (1988). "The one and only Trophime Bigot". The Burlington Magazine. 130 (1022): 355–357. JSTOR 883417.
- Champion, Maurice (1862). Les inondations en France depuis le VIe siècle jusqu'a nos jours (Volume 4) (in French). Paris: V. Dalmont.
- Dauzat, Albert; Rostaing, Charles (1963). Dictionnaire étymologique des noms de lieux en France (in French). Paris: Larousse.
- Girard, Joseph (1958). Évocation du Vieil Avignon (in French). Paris: Les Éditions de Minuit. OCLC 5391399.
- Mistral, Frédéric (1979) [1879]. Lou Trésor dou Félibrige ou Dictionnaire provençal-français (Volume 1: A-F ) (in French and Occitan). Raphèle-lès-Arles: M. Petit.
- Rouquette, Jean-Maurice (1974). Provence Romane: La Provence Rhodanienne (in French, English, and German). Paris: Zodiaque. OCLC 1036957.
- Rostaing, Charles (1994) [1950]. Essai sur la toponymie de la Provence: depuis les origines jusqu'aux invasions barbares (in French). Marseille: Jeanne Laffitte. ISBN 978-273480676-9.
- Vella, Marc-Antoine; et al. (2013). "Géoarchéologie du Rhône dans le secteur du pont Saint-Bénézet (Avignon, Provence, France) au cours de la seconde moitié du deuxième millénaire apr. J.-C.: étude croisée de géographie historique et des paléoenvironnements". Géomorphologie: Relief, Processus, Environnement (in French and English). 3: 287–310. doi:10.4000/geomorphologie.10300.
- Vingtain, Dominique; Aujard-Catot, Roland, eds. (2001). Avignon: Musées, Monuments, Promenades (in French). Paris: Éditions du patrimoine. ISBN 2-85822-555-9.
- Vitaglione, Daniel (2000). The Literature of Provence: An Introduction. Jefferson, North Carolina: McFarland. ISBN 9780786408436.
- Xavier de Fourvière, R.P.; Rupert, R.P. (1902). Lou pichot tresor, dictionnaire provençal-français et français-provençal. Avignon: Aubanel.
- Herbermann, Charles, ed. (1913). "Avignon" . Catholic Encyclopedia. New York: Robert Appleton Company.
- Herbermann, Charles, ed. (1913). "Councils of Avignon" . Catholic Encyclopedia. New York: Robert Appleton Company.
- Herbermann, Charles, ed. (1913). "University of Avignon" . Catholic Encyclopedia. New York: Robert Appleton Company.
- "Avignon" . Encyclopædia Britannica. Vol. 3 (11th ed.). 1911. p. 63-64.
