= Arrondissement of Avignon =

Coordinates: 43.95°N 4.82°E

Avignon
- Arrondissement
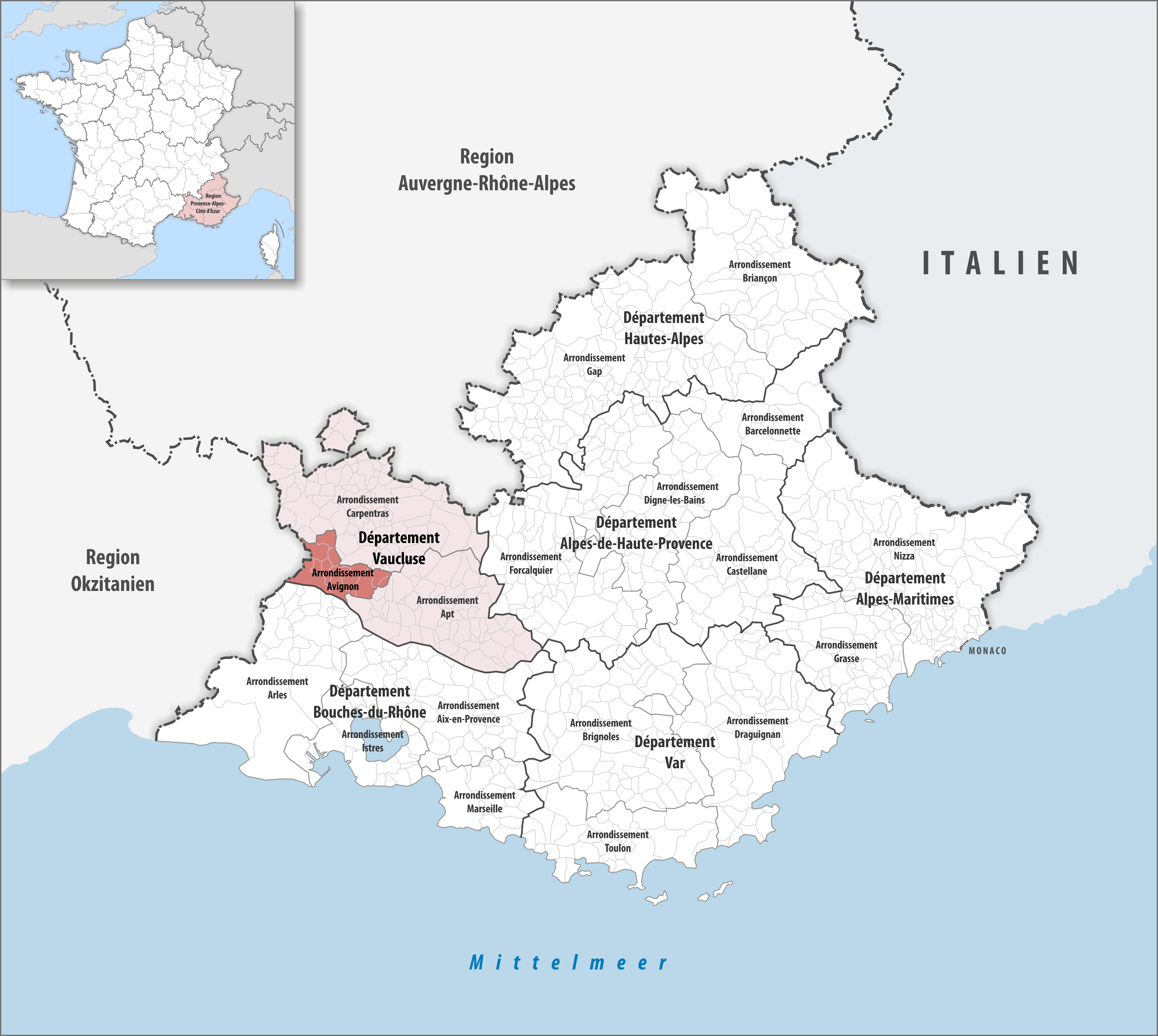
- Location within the region Provence-Alpes-Côte d'Azur
- Country: France
- Region: Provence-Alpes-Côte d'Azur
- Department: Vaucluse
- No. of communes: {{{nbcomm}}}
- Area: 336.9 km^{2} (130.1 sq mi)
- Population (2023): 214,966
  - Density: 638.1/km^{2} (1,653/sq mi)
- INSEE code: 842

The arrondissement of Avignon is an arrondissement of France in the Vaucluse department in the Provence-Alpes-Côte d'Azur region. It has 16 communes. Its population is 210,535 (2021), and its area is 336.9 km^{2} (130.1 sq mi).

== Composition ==
The communes of the arrondissement of Avignon, and their INSEE codes, are:

1. Avignon (84007)
2. Bédarrides (84016)
3. Caumont-sur-Durance (84034)
4. Châteauneuf-de-Gadagne (84036)
5. Entraigues-sur-la-Sorgue (84043)
6. Fontaine-de-Vaucluse (84139)
7. L'Isle-sur-la-Sorgue (84054)
8. Jonquerettes (84055)
9. Morières-lès-Avignon (84081)
10. Le Pontet (84092)
11. Saint-Saturnin-lès-Avignon (84119)
12. Saumane-de-Vaucluse (84124)
13. Sorgues (84129)
14. Le Thor (84132)
15. Vedène (84141)
16. Velleron (84142)

== History ==
The arrondissement of Avignon was created in 1800. At the January 2017 reorganisation of the arrondissements of Vaucluse, it received one commune from the arrondissement of Apt and two communes from the arrondissement of Carpentras, and it lost two communes to the arrondissement of Apt and 21 communes to the arrondissement of Carpentras.

As a result of the reorganisation of the cantons of France which came into effect in 2015, the borders of the cantons are no longer related to the borders of the arrondissements. The cantons of the arrondissement of Avignon were, as of January 2015:

1. Avignon-Est
2. Avignon-Nord
3. Avignon-Ouest
4. Avignon-Sud
5. Bédarrides
6. Bollène
7. L'Isle-sur-la-Sorgue
8. Orange-Est
9. Orange-Ouest
10. Valréas
