= Vaucluse's 3rd constituency =

Constituency of the National Assembly of France

3rd constituency of Vaucluse
- inline Constituency of the National Assembly of France

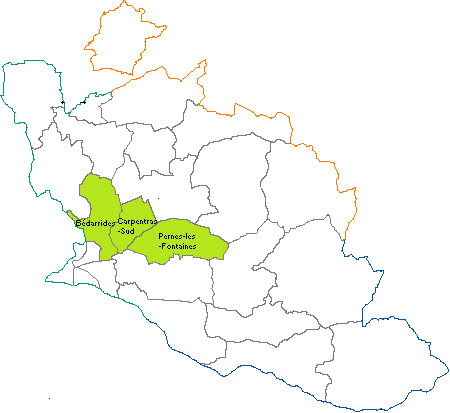
- Deputy: Hervé de Lépinau; RN
- Department: Vaucluse
- Cantons: Bédarrides, Carpentras-Sud, Pernes-les-Fontaines.

The 3rd constituency of Vaucluse is a French legislative constituency in the Vaucluse département (Provence-Alpes-Côte d'Azur). Marion Maréchal-Le Pen, a member of the National Front, represented the constituency during the XIV legislature (2012–2017). It has been held by Brune Poirson and her substitute, Adrien Morenas of REM since 2017.

== History, geography and demography ==
According to the division into constituencies by the law n°86-1197 of 24 November 1986, the 3rd constituency of Vaucluse included six cantons : Bédarrides, Carpentras-Nord, Carpentras-Sud, Mormoiron, Pernes-les-Fontaines, Sault. According to the national census conducted in 1999 by the French National Institute for Statistics and Economic Studies (INSEE), the total population of the constituency was estimated at 127,749 inhabitants.

Approved in February 2010 by the Constitutional Council of France, the redistricting of electoral boundaries came into effect from the 2012 legislative elections. Ratified on 21 January 2010 by the Parliament of France, the ordonnance n°2009-935 of 29 July 2009 reduced the area of the constituency.

Stretched over 345.72 km^{2} (133.48 sq mi), the 3rd constituency consists of three cantons and fifteen municipalities: Bédarrides (Bédarrides, Courthézon, Sorgues, Vedène), Carpentras-Sud (Althen-des-Paluds, southern part of Carpentras, Entraigues-sur-la-Sorgue, Mazan, Monteux), Pernes-les-Fontaines (Le Beaucet, Pernes-les-Fontaines, La Roque-sur-Pernes, Saint-Didier, Velleron, Venasque). After the boundary changes, the population of the constituency amounted to 96,291 inhabitants in 2008 and 97,206 inhabitants in 2009.

== Deputies ==
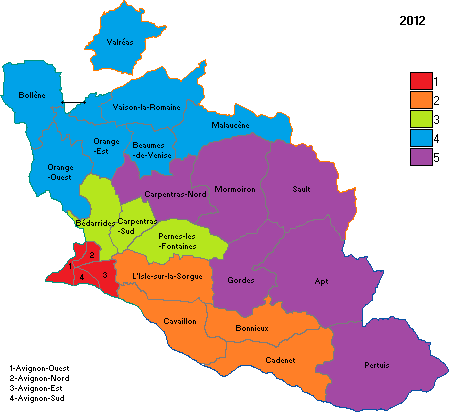
Vaucluse's five constituencies in 2012

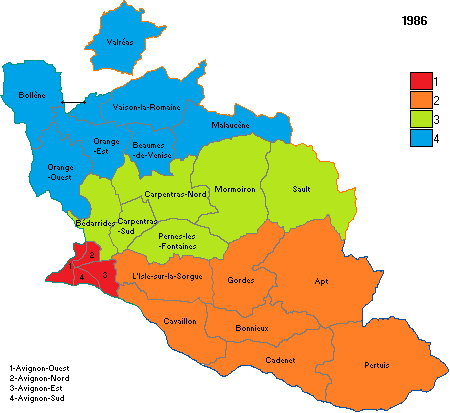
Vaucluse's four constituencies in 1986

Election	Member	Party	Notes
1986	Proportional representation		
1988	Jean-Michel Ferrand	RPR	
1993	Jean-Michel Ferrand	RPR	
1997	Jean-Michel Ferrand	RPR	
2002	Jean-Michel Ferrand	UMP	
2007	Jean-Michel Ferrand	UMP	
2012	Marion Maréchal-Le Pen	FN	
2017	Brune Poirson	LREM	
2017	Adrien Morenas	LREM	substitute for Brune Poirson, replaced her while she was secretary of state for Ecological and Inclusive Transition
2020	Brune Poirson	LREM	
2021	Adrien Morenas	LREM	Replaced Poirson when she left the National Assembly
2022	Hervé de Lépinau	RN	

== Election results ==
=== 2024 ===
Legislative Election 2024: Vaucluse's 3rd constituency
Party	Candidate	Votes	%	±%
RN	Hervé de Lépinau	28,153	53.51	+16.48
PCF (NFP)	Muriel Duenas	10,895	20.71	+1.55
RE (Ensemble)	Souad Zitouni	8,947	17.01	−5.01
LR	Christophe Tonnaire	3,284	6.24	−0.43
LO	Bertrand Helleu	671	1.28	n/a
REC	Louis Roussel	662	1.26	−5.26
Turnout		52,612	96.99	+50.08
Registered electors		79,341		
RN hold				

=== 2022 ===
Legislative Election 2022: Vaucluse's 3rd constituency
Party	Candidate	Votes	%	±%
RN	Hervé de Lépinau	13,430	37.03	+5.22
LREM (Ensemble)	Adrien Morenas	7,985	22.02	-10.05
PCF (NUPÉS)	Muriel Duenas	6,947	19.16	+1.84
LR (UDC)	Christophe Tonnaire	2,418	6.67	−7.06
REC	Christian Montagard	2,364	6.52	N/A
DVE	Bernard Maunier	825	2.27	N/A
Others	N/A	2,298	6.33	
Turnout		36,267	46.91	−0.22
2nd round result
RN	Hervé de Lépinau	19,606	58.83	+9.51
LREM (Ensemble)	Adrien Morenas	13,723	41.17	−9.51
Turnout		33,329	45.74	+4.45
RN gain from LREM				

=== 2017 ===
Legislative Election 2017: Vaucluse's 3rd constituency
Party	Candidate	Votes	%	±%
LREM	Brune Poirson	11,425	32.07	
FN	Hervé de Lépinau	11,335	31.81	
LR	Gilles Veve	4,893	13.73	
LFI	Laurence Cermolacce-Boissier	3,952	11.09	
PCF	Mina Idir	1,245	3.49	
EELV	Bernard Maunier	978	2.74	
DLF	Emmanuel Cointot	787	2.21	
Others	N/A	1,014		
Turnout		35,629	47.13	
2nd round result
LREM	Brune Poirson	15,821	50.68	
FN	Hervé de Lépinau	15,398	49.32	
Turnout		31,219	41.29	
LREM gain from FN				

=== 2012 ===
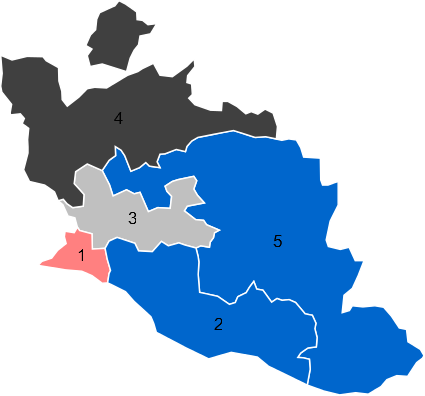
Results in the Vaucluse's five constituencies in 2012: pink (PS), blue (UMP), grey (FN), black (League of South)

2012 legislative election in Vaucluse's 3rd constituency
Candidate	Party	First round		Second round	
Candidate	Party	Votes	%	Votes	%
Marion Maréchal-Le Pen	FN	15,172	34.65%	18,920	42.09%
Jean-Michel Ferrand	UMP	13,151	30.03%	16,100	35.82%
Catherine Arkilovitch	PS	9,624	21.98%	9,926	22.08%
Roger Martin	FG	3,392	7.75%		
Astrid Ducros	AC	796	1.82%		
Bernard Maunier	LT	767	1.75%		
Bernard Hofmann	MoDem	712	1.63%		
Bertrand Helleu	LO	178	0.41%		
Valid votes		43,792	98.85%	44,946	98.35%
Spoilt and null votes		509	1.15%	752	1.65%
Votes cast / turnout		44,301	62.47%	45,698	64.44%
Abstentions		26,617	37.53%	25,214	35.56%
Registered voters		70,918	100.00%	70,912	100.00%

=== 2007 ===
Legislative Election 2007: Vaucluse's 3rd constituency
Party	Candidate	Votes	%	±%
UMP	Jean-Michel Ferrand	28,550	48.79	
PS	Nadine Peris	9,619	16.44	
FN	Guy Macary	4,588	7.84	
MoDem	Christian Chavrier	4,051	6.92	
MPF	Hervé de Lepinau	3,008	5.14	
PCF	Vivian Point	2,267	3.87	
Far left	Michel Cammal	1,789	3.06	
LV	Benoît Magnat	1,253	2.14	
Others	N/A	3,393		
Turnout		59,562	61.20	
2nd round result
UMP	Jean-Michel Ferrand	35,680	64.47	
PS	Nadine Peris	19,660	35.53	
Turnout		57,661	59.25	
UMP hold				

=== 2002 ===
Legislative Election 2002: Vaucluse's 3rd constituency
Party	Candidate	Votes	%	±%
UMP	Jean-Michel Ferrand	23,080	40.18	
FN	Guy Macary	14,250	24.81	
LV	Benoît Magnat	9,473	16.49	
PCF	Guy Moureau	4,998	8.70	
Others	N/A	5,641		
Turnout		58,960	66.10	
2nd round result
UMP	Jean-Michel Ferrand	31,068	67.85	
FN	Guy Macary	14,723	32.15	
Turnout		51,343	57.58	
UMP hold				

=== 1997 ===
Legislative Election 1997: Vaucluse's 3rd constituency
Party	Candidate	Votes	%	±%
RPR	Jean-Michel Ferrand	15,887	29.02	
FN	Guy Macary	14,146	25.84	
DVG	Christian Gros	8,011	14.63	
PCF	Roger Martin	5,866	10.72	
LV	Bernard Senet	5,858	10.70	
DVD	Bernard Autric	1,871	3.42	
Others	N/A	3,100		
Turnout		57,384	70.76	
2nd round result
RPR	Jean-Michel Ferrand	30,602	63.00	
FN	Guy Macary	17,969	37.00	
Turnout		58,267	71.86	
RPR hold				

== Sources ==
- (in French) Notes and portraits of the French MPs under the Fifth Republic, French National Assembly
- (in French) Vaucluse's 3rd constituency: cartography, National Assembly of France
- (in French) 2012 French legislative elections: Vaucluse's 3rd constituency (first round and run-off), Minister of the Interior (France)
