= Results of the 2024 French legislative election in Vaucluse =

Following the first round of the 2024 French legislative election on 30 June 2024, runoff elections in each constituency where no candidate received a vote share greater than 50 percent were scheduled for 7 July. Candidates permitted to stand in the runoff elections needed to either come in first or second place in the first round or achieve more than 12.5 percent of the votes of the entire electorate (as opposed to 12.5 percent of the vote share due to low turnout).

== Vaucluse ==
=== 1st constituency ===
Candidate	Party or alliance		First round		Second round	
Candidate	Party or alliance		Votes	%	Votes	%
Catherine Jaouen	National Rally		15,598	34.62	18,739	45.02
Raphaël Arnault	New Popular Front	La France Insoumise	11,155	24.76	22,883	54.98
Philippe Pascal	Miscellaneous left	La France Insoumise (Note: Dissident who ran without the support of the New Popular Front)	8,229	18.27		
Malika Di Fraja	Ensemble	Renaissance	7,264	16.12		
Johan Courtois	The Republicans		1,459	3.24		
Philippe Toutain	Reconquête		594	1.32		
Christine Chatenay	Regionalists	Independent	391	0.87		
Eddine Ghouali	Far-left	Lutte Ouvrière	361	0.80		
Total			45,051	100.00	41,622	100.00
Valid votes			45,051	97.62	41,622	90.19
Invalid votes			325	0.70	1,102	2.39
Blank votes			773	1.68	3,423	7.42
Total votes			46,149	100.00	46,147	100.00
Registered voters/turnout			74,020	62.35	74,035	62.33

=== 2nd constituency ===
Candidate	Party or alliance		First round		Second round	
Candidate	Party or alliance		Votes	%	Votes	%
Bénédicte Auzanot	National Rally		26,667	45.95	31,195	56.98
Patrick Blanes	New Popular Front	Socialist Party	14,421	24.85	23,551	43.02
Sylvie Viala	Ensemble	Democratic Movement	11,260	19.40		
Dominique Brogi	The Republicans		4,008	6.91		
Julien Langard	Reconquête		999	1.72		
Gérard Mangiavillano	Far-left	Lutte Ouvrière	590	1.02		
José-Angel Sanchez	Independent		84	0.14		
Total			58,029	100.00	54,746	100.00
Valid votes			58,029	97.38	54,746	92.09
Invalid votes			480	0.81	1,067	1.79
Blank votes			1,081	1.81	3,633	6.11
Total votes			59,590	100.00	59,446	100.00
Registered voters/turnout			86,479	68.91	86,496	68.73

=== 3rd constituency ===
Candidate	Party or alliance		Votes	%
Hervé de Lépinau	National Rally		28,153	53.51
Muriel Duenas	New Popular Front	Communist Party	10,895	20.71
Souad Zitouni	Ensemble	Renaissance	8,947	17.01
Christophe Tonnaire	The Republicans		3,284	6.24
Bertrand Helleu	Far-left	Lutte Ouvrière	671	1.28
Louis Roussel	Reconquête		662	1.26
Total			52,612	100.00
Valid votes			52,612	96.99
Invalid votes			520	0.96
Blank votes			1,112	2.05
Total votes			54,244	100.00
Registered voters/turnout			79,341	68.37

=== 4th constituency ===
Candidate	Party or alliance		First round		Second round	
Candidate	Party or alliance		Votes	%	Votes	%
Marie-France Lorho	National Rally		30,192	49.89	35,853	65.43
Monia Galvez	New Popular Front	La France Insoumise	11,887	19.64	18,946	34.57
Lise Chauvot	Ensemble	Renaissance	10,449	17.27		
David Marseille	The Republicans		2,685	4.44		
Marie-Claude Bompard	Reconquête		2,125	3.51		
Bruno Coulon	Union of Democrats and Independents (Note: Dissident who ran without the support of Ensemble)		1,893	3.13		
Anne-Marie Hautant	Regionalists	Independent	729	1.20		
Nicolas Petillot	Far-left	Lutte Ouvrière	556	0.92		
Total			60,516	100.00	54,799	100.00
Valid votes			60,516	96.92	54,799	88.92
Invalid votes			510	0.82	1,257	2.04
Blank votes			1,412	2.26	5,570	9.04
Total votes			62,438	100.00	61,626	100.00
Registered voters/turnout			90,634	68.89	90,653	67.98

=== 5th constituency ===
Candidate	Party or alliance		First round		Second round	
Candidate	Party or alliance		Votes	%	Votes	%
Catherine Rimbert	National Rally		25,415	45.03	29,669	55.39
Céline Celce	New Popular Front	Génération.s	15,329	27.16	23,891	44.61
Adrien Morenas	Ensemble	Renaissance	11,454	20.29		
Martin Lefèvre	The Republicans		3,512	6.22		
Alexandre Deshaies	Reconquête		734	1.30		
Total			56,444	100.00	53,560	100.00
Valid votes			56,444	96.83	53,560	91.62
Invalid votes			686	1.18	1,157	1.98
Blank votes			1,160	1.99	3,741	6.40
Total votes			58,290	100.00	58,458	100.00
Registered voters/turnout			84,944	68.62	84,965	68.80
