= Avignon tramway =

Public transport system in Avignon, France

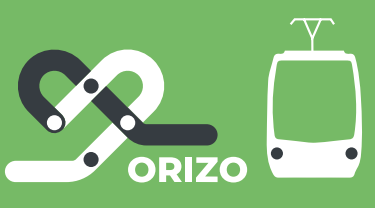

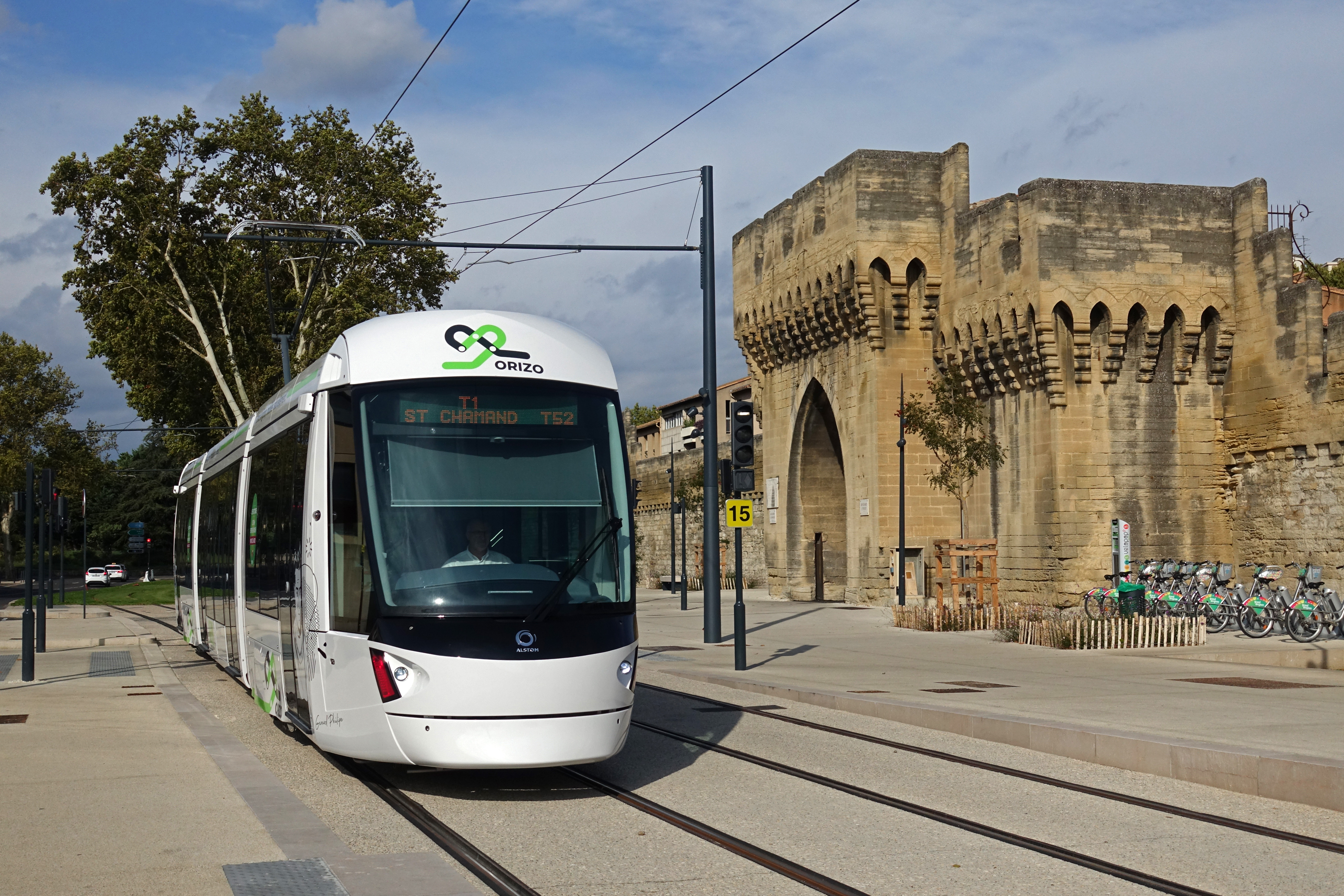
- Tram approaching the Saint-Roch stop

Overview
- Native name: Tramway d'Avignon
- Owner: Grand Avignon
- Locale: Avignon, France
- Transit type: Tram
- Number of lines: 1
- Number of stations: 10
- Website: www.orizo.fr

Operation
- Began operation: 19 October 2019
- Operator: Orizo
- Rolling stock: Alstom Citadis
- Number of vehicles: 14

Technical
- System length: 5.2 km (3.2 mi)
- Track gauge: 1,435 mm (4 ft 8 1/2 in) standard gauge
- Average speed: 30 km/h (19 mph)
- Top speed: 70 km/h (43 mph)
System map

The Avignon tramway (French: Tramway d'Avignon) is a tramway network serving the city of Avignon in Provence-Alpes-Côte d'Azur, France and its surrounding area. It is under the authority of Grand Avignon and is managed by the Orizo network. The tramway entered service on 19 October 2019, and comprises a 5.2 km (3.2 mi) line, named T1. Construction of line T2, which is still under planning, has not yet been scheduled.

A metre-gauge tram had already operated in the city from 1901 to 1932; it replaced the horse-drawn omnibuses introduced in 1889.

== History ==
=== 19th–20th centuries: Old network ===
The original Avignon tramway was built at the end of the 19th century. This network, which was one of the first to be deployed by a medium-sized town in France, had its own depots (at the Clos des Trams) and its own power plant. It carried up to 2 million passengers a year and served the city centre, all suburban districts, and part of the suburbs of Avignon.

Construction of the network began in 1898, and the six lines were put into operation in 1901. In 1905, the network of the Compagnie des tramways électriques d’Avignon was reduced to five lines. 18 railcars were available for operation. All lines together had a length of 21.8 km (13.5 mi), which ran on 17 km (10.6 mi) of track. Up to 2 million passengers were transported annually. From 1918 onwards, traffic declined by 25%. As a result, operations had to be discontinued on 31 May 1932.

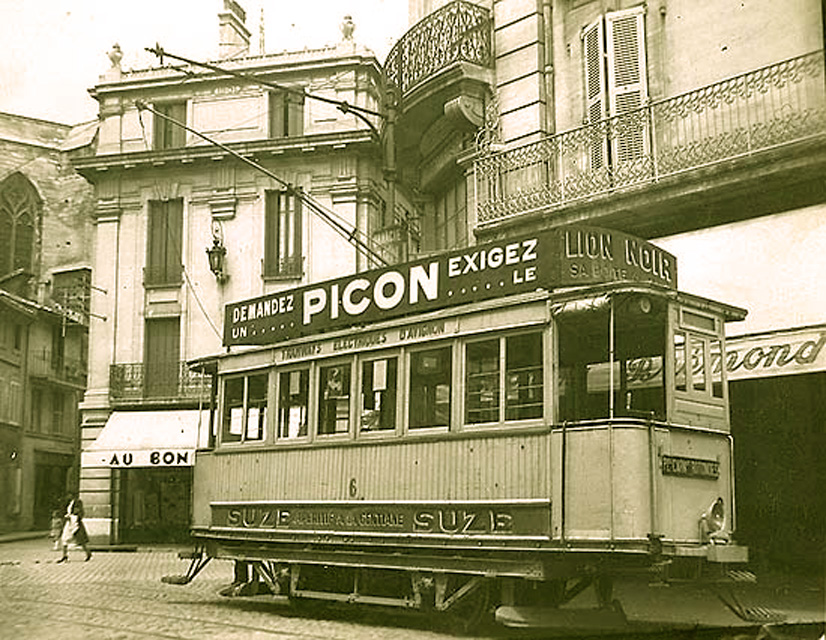
Railcar on Place Carnot

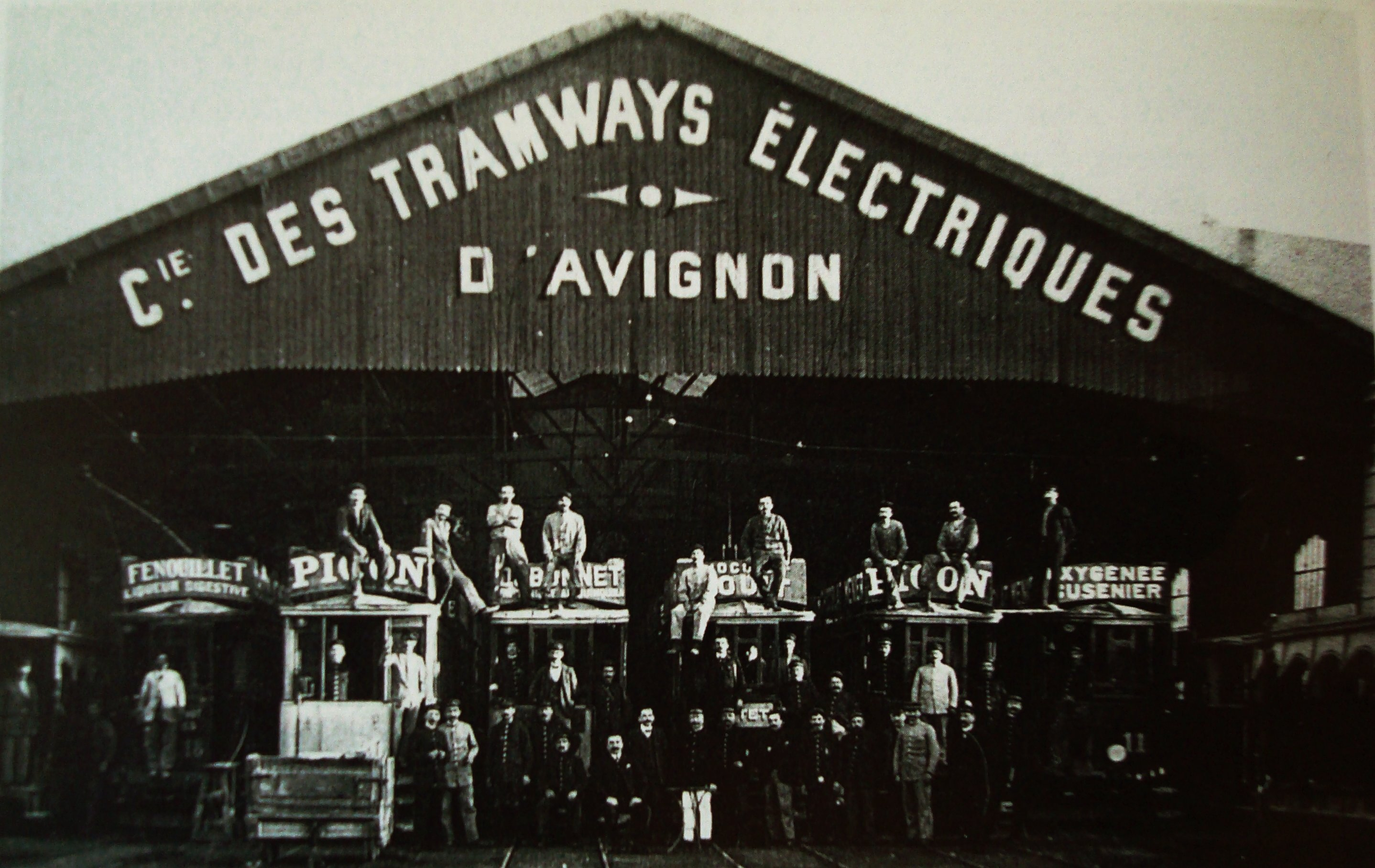
Depot around 1905

Animated map of the evolution of the railway infrastructure of the Avignon metropolitan area, including that of the old and current tramways, from 1895 to the present day.

=== 2010–2013: Tramway project ===
Originally planned network

On 27 September 2010, elected officials from Grand Avignon unanimously voted to create a new tramway network and to restructure the entire public transport network. On 18 April 2011, the National Commission for Public Debate was asked to consider the project to build two tramway lines, for a total of 250 million euros.

During the summer of 2011, Greater Avignon consulted the public on the routes of the two planned tramway lines. The final route unveiled in May 2012 announced the creation of line A, 9.2 km (5.7 mi) long on an east–west axis, serving sixteen stations and line B, with 5.2 km (3.2 mi) of track for ten stations.

The invitation to tender for rolling stock was launched in September 2012 and covers 24 Citadis Compact trams, with a maximum length of 24 m (78.7 ft) and a width of 2.4 m (7.9 ft) built by Alstom.

=== 2014–2015: Project modification ===
At the end of 2013, the start of work was planned for 2016. However, in 2014, Cécile Helle was elected mayor of Avignon and decided to cancel the tramway project.

Following negotiations between the city and the agglomeration, the tramway project was not cancelled but modified, including in particular a phasing of the project's implementation with the construction of bus rapid transit lines, called Chron'hop, to complete the tramway. The new project was voted on 10 January 2015 by the elected officials of Grand Avignon.

=== 2016–2019: Construction of the T1 line ===
On 17 October 2016, construction work on the T1 line officially began, resulting in numerous constraints for local residents, including the complete closure of avenues Saint-Ruf and Tarascon.

The work took place in three phases. The first phase included diversions of underground networks to be moved from the tramway right-of-way. It ended in April 2017. The second phase included the construction of tracks, overhead lines and urban developments, and ended in December 2018. The final phase of construction, which involved testing the rolling stock and training drivers, started in January 2019. However, due to the delay in the construction of the line, the tests were not actually carried out until May 2019, leading to a delay of four months in commissioning. The T1 line was inaugurated on 19 October 2019 in the presence of Mireille Mathieu, Renaud Muselier (regional president), Cécile Helle (mayor of Avignon), and Jean-Marc Roubaud, former president of Grand Avignon.

=== After 2030: Construction of the T2 line ===
On 9 March 2018, elected officials from Grand Avignon voted to validate the project for line T2 of the Greater Avignon tramway. Studies for the line began in 2020. The Grand Avignon authority decided to postpone the work for one year, to 2022, so that it did not have too much of an impact on businesses already struggling due to the COVID-19 pandemic. Although the route is located in an area where there are few shops on line T2 (rampart tower, Rhône) the construction of a new section on the Cours Jean Jaurès risks impacting the many bars and restaurants in the surrounding area. The construction of line T2 has been postponed and its commissioning date has not been communicated.

In the long term, line T2 should connect Avignon to Le Pontet to complete, when this new section is put into service, the initial project voted on in 2010.

== Projects ==
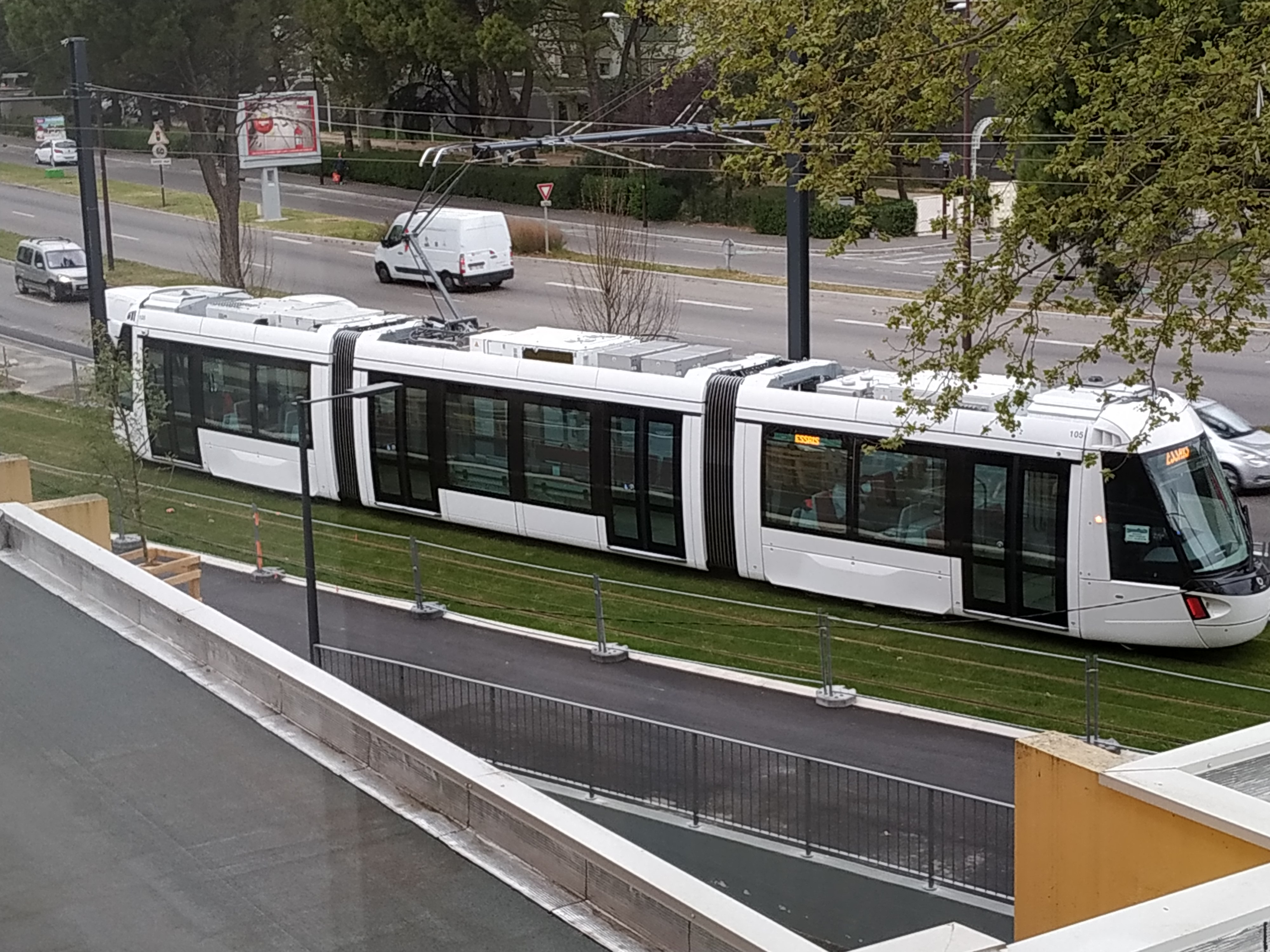
Tram during testing in April 2019

=== Extension to Horloge – Town Hall ===
In the long term, line T1 is planned to be extended north towards the Place de l'Horloge where Avignon City Hall and the Opéra Grand Avignon are located.

=== Line T2 ===
Extension to Gare du Pontet

In the long term, the line is expected to be built to the closed Le Pontet station on the Paris–Marseille railway, including its reopening to passengers and the installation of a new park and ride facility.

The east of the T2 line will divide into two branches to better serve the town of Le Pontet, one towards Le Pontet Station (T2a) and another towards the Réalpanier Commercial Zone (T2b).

Extension to Réalpanier

In coordination with the extension to Pontet station, Line T2 will be extended to the Réalpanier Commercial Zone, including the installation of a new park-and-ride facility, or even a second tramway maintenance and operations centre.

== Rolling stock ==
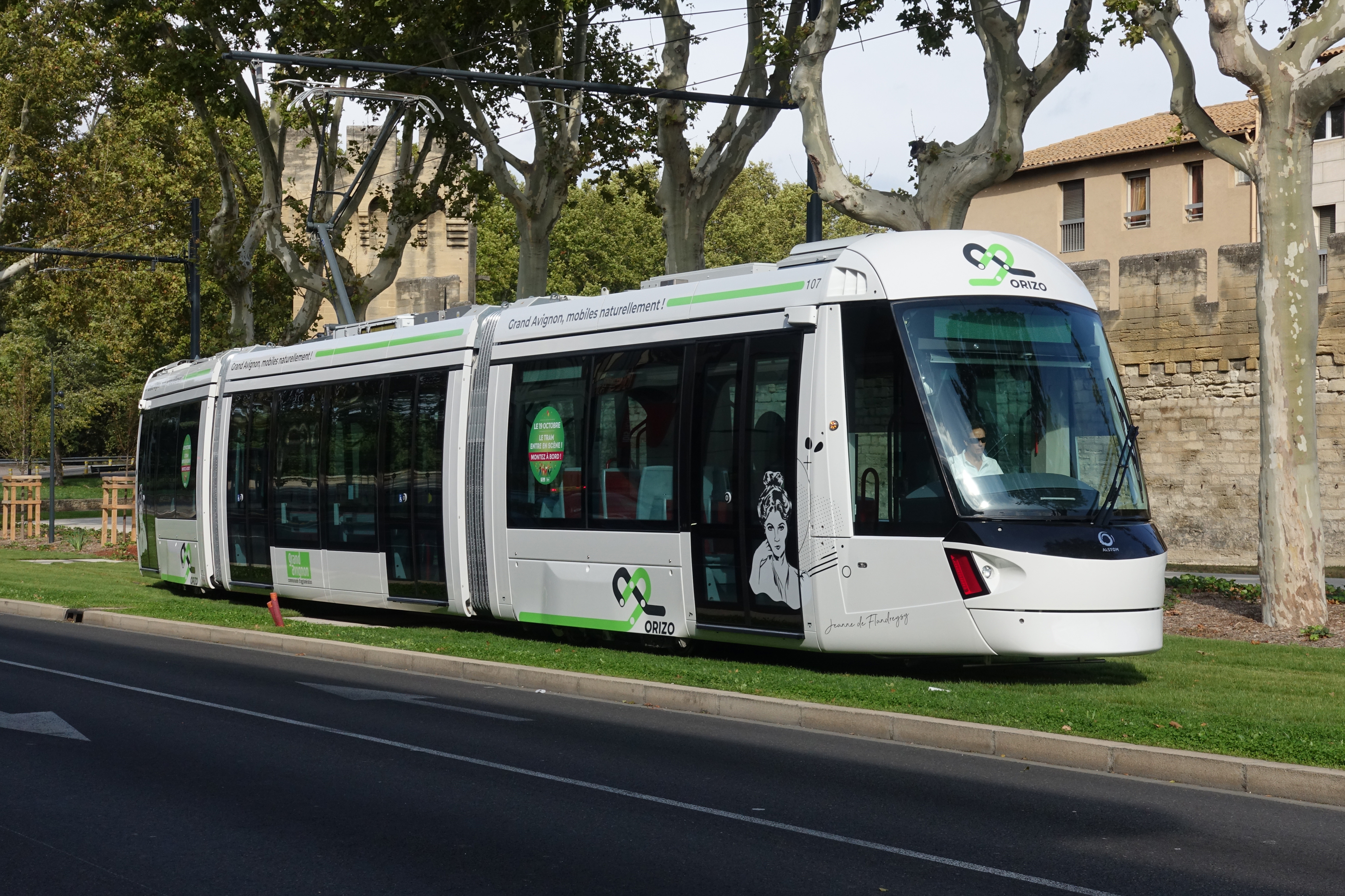
Tram 107 named "Jeanne de Flandreysy"

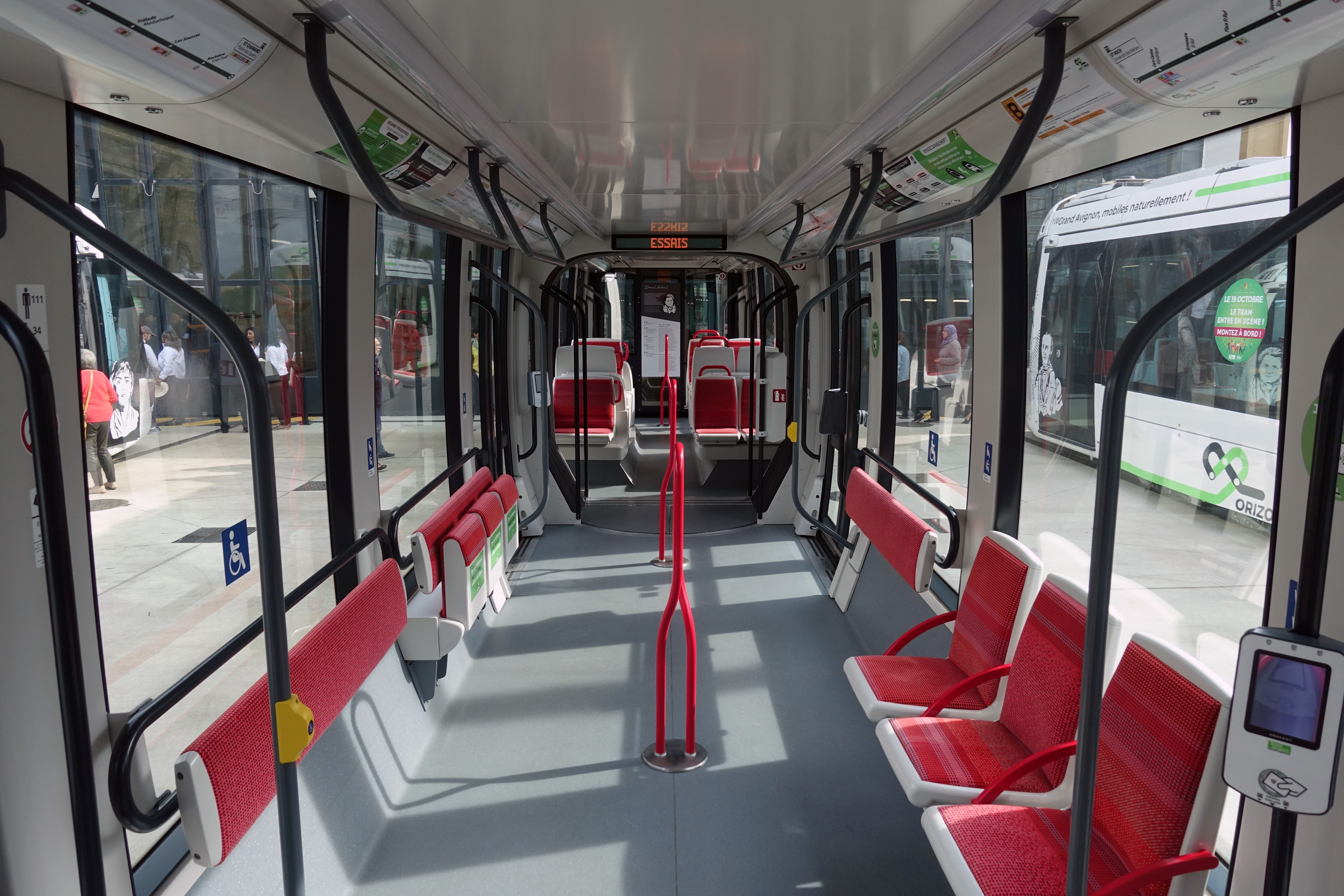
Interior of a tram

On 9 March 2017, Jean-Marc Roubaud, president of Grand Avignon, signed a contract with Alstom for a total amount of 25 million euros.

It contained plans to produce ten 24-metre-long Alstom Citadis Compact trainsets in 2019, which can be extended directly at the Avignon Maintenance Centre; and four additional trainsets in 2023.

The trains are white in color and have a blue-grey interior with upholstered seats in orange, anise green, blue and fuscia red. They were built at the Alstom factory in La Rochelle and were delivered to Avignon gradually between December 2018 and December 2019.

The 14 trams are each named after an artistic personality with a link to Avignon with a biographical plaque and a summary of the works inside the tram. The singer Mireille Mathieu inaugurated a tram in her own name on 19 October 2019. The other personalities chosen are: Daniel Auteuil, Jeanne de Flandreysy, Henri Bosco, Jean Vilar, Gérard Philipe, Elsa Triolet, Camille Claudel, María Casares, Pierre Boulle, René Girard, Agricol Perdiguier, Nicolas Mignard, and Olivier Messiaen.

=== Depot ===
The tram depot is located on Avenue Pierre de Coubertin, in the Saint-Chamand district, southeast of Avignon.
