= Orizo =

Public transport operator in Avignon

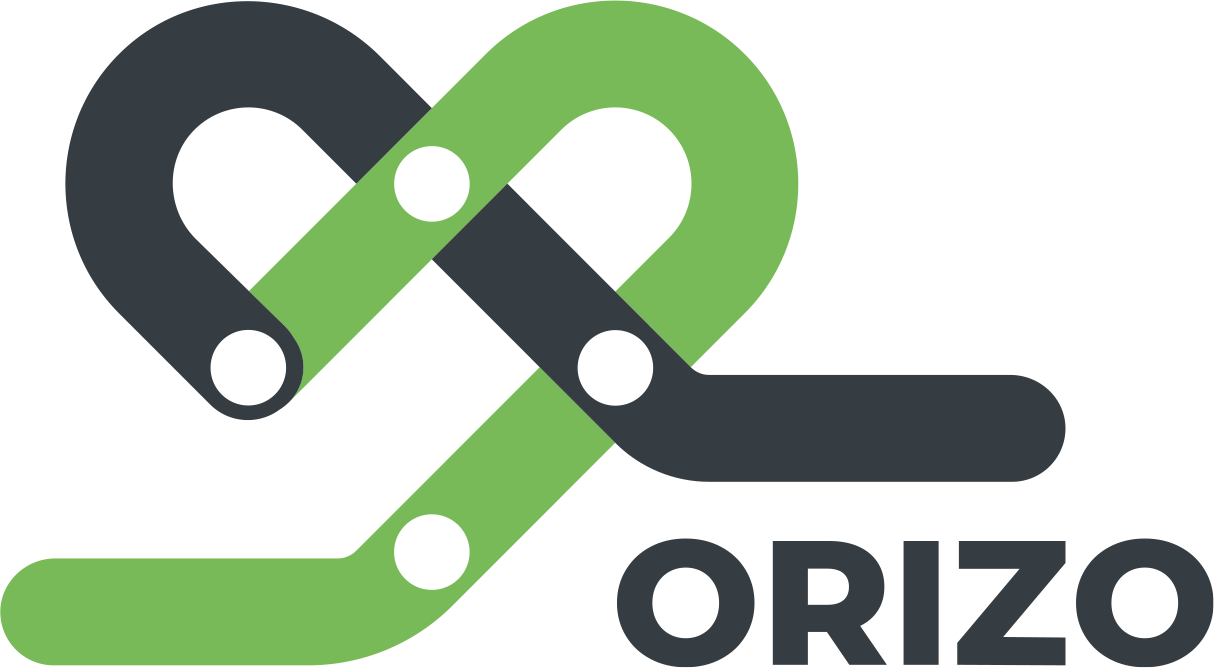
- Logo of the Orizo network

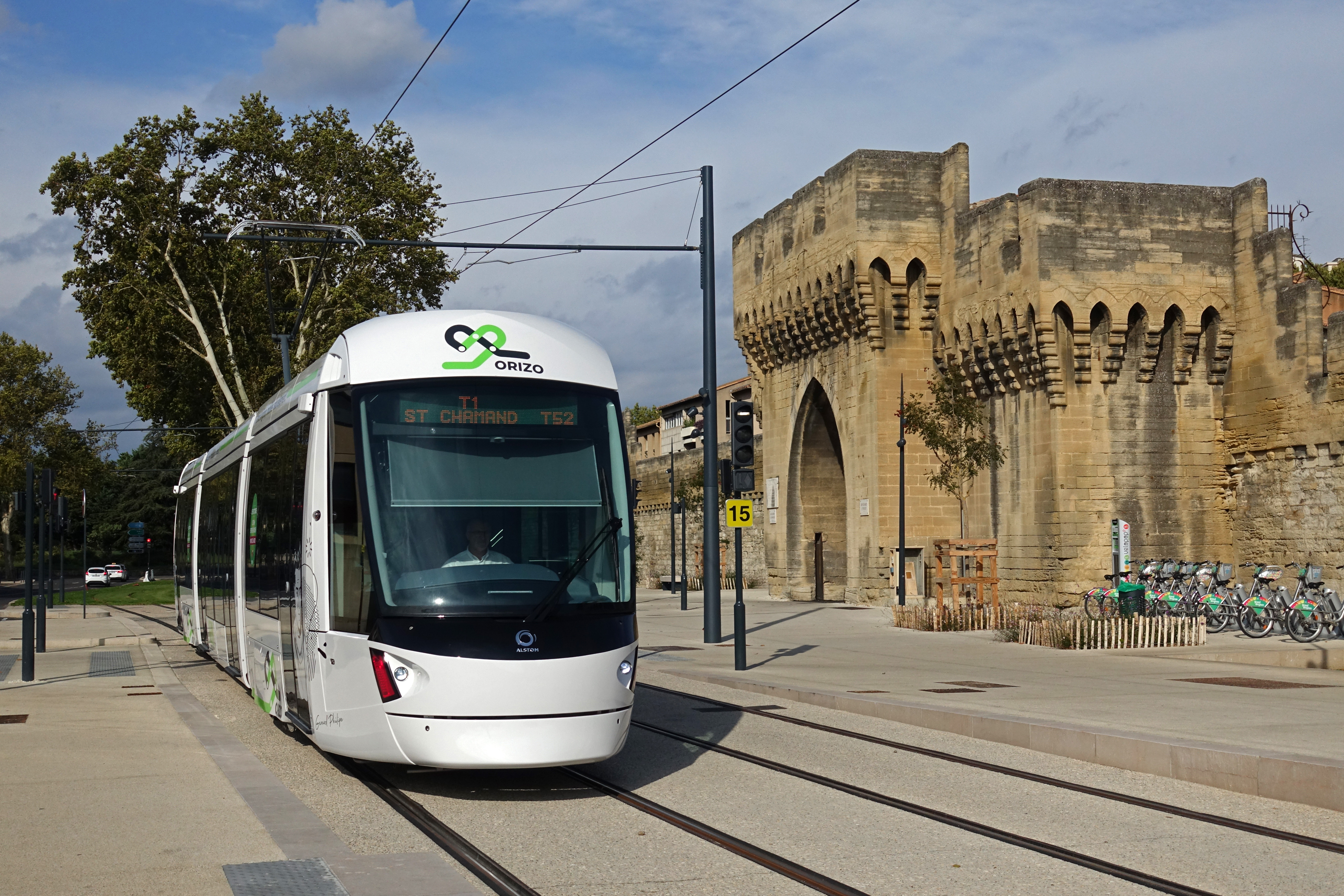
- A tramway train in the Saint-Roch terminus

Overview
- Owner: Grand Avignon
- Area served: Grand Avignon
- Transit type: Tramway; BRT; Bus; Velopop'
- Website: https://www.orizo.fr/

Operation
- Began operation: March 1979 (former TCRA network); October 2019 (current network)
- Operator: Tecelys

Orizo (formerly TCRA) is the public network transportation of Avignon (located in the south of France) and surroundings (Grand Avignon). This network is operated by the public company Tecelys.

The Orizo Network contains :

- 1 tramway line
- 2 bus rapid transit (BRT) lines : Chron'hop
- 27 regular bus lines (9 main, 14 local and 4 intra-muros)
- 11 on-demand bus lines : AlloBus
- 32 school bus lines
- A bicycle-sharing system : Vélopop'.

== Tramway ==
The Orizo network includes one 10-station tramway line. In the first year of operation, the line transported 1.2 million passengers.

- T1 : Saint-Roch – Université des Métiers ↔ Saint-Chamand – Plaine des Sports

14 Alstom Citadis Compact trams are currently circulating on T1. They are white and each feature a local personality. Mireille Mathieu was present to inaugurate a train bearing her name.

- T2 : P+R Île Piot ↔ Saint-Lazare – Université Arendt

A second tramway line was approved in 2018. It will contain 7 stations and will be 3.2 km long. It was planned to open in 2025.

== BRT ==
The Orizo network own 2 BRT lines named « Chron'hop » with 56 stations for 25 km since 2019 :

- C2 : Hôpital ↔ Buld'Air
- C3 : Saint-Lazare ↔ Agroparc
- C4 : Avignon Poste ↔ Agroparc (in progress)
- C5 : Palais de Justice ↔ Villeneuve Cigalières (in progress)

== Autobus ==
The Orizo network owns 72 bus lines (29 regular lines, 11 on-demand lines and 32 school lines) in the entire area of Grand Avignon.

All bus lines are in correspondence with the tramway line, 2 BRT lines "Chron'hop" and Vélopop' stations.

== Bike sharing system ==
The Orizo network owns 29 stations and 300 bicycles for the bike-sharing system of Avignon Velopop'.

Stations are mainly located in Avignon, notably at the Agroparc Technopôle, the public hospital, in the city center and close to the tramway line.

== Pricing ==
The Orizo network owns a unique pricing system in the entire network (excepted Velopop').

A simple ticket cost €1.40, a 24h ticket cost €3.50 (a 48h version is also available for €7) and the 10-travel ticket costs 10 €.

Correspondences are free (up to 1 hour) starting from the first validation of the ticket. The switching with other transport modes (Tram + Chron'hop + Bus) are possible.

All tickets are contactless and rechargeable, you can find tickets are automatic tickets dispenser (on the tram path and some stations in BRT paths), online (with the official site), and in some partner stores.

== See also ==
- Vélopop'
- Communauté d'agglomération du Grand Avignon
- Avignon
