= Buxenus =

In Gallo-Roman religion, Buxenus was an epithet of the Gaulish Mars, known from a single inscription found in Velleron in the Vaucluse.
