= Les Angles, Gard =

Commune in Occitanie, France

Les Angles
- Commune
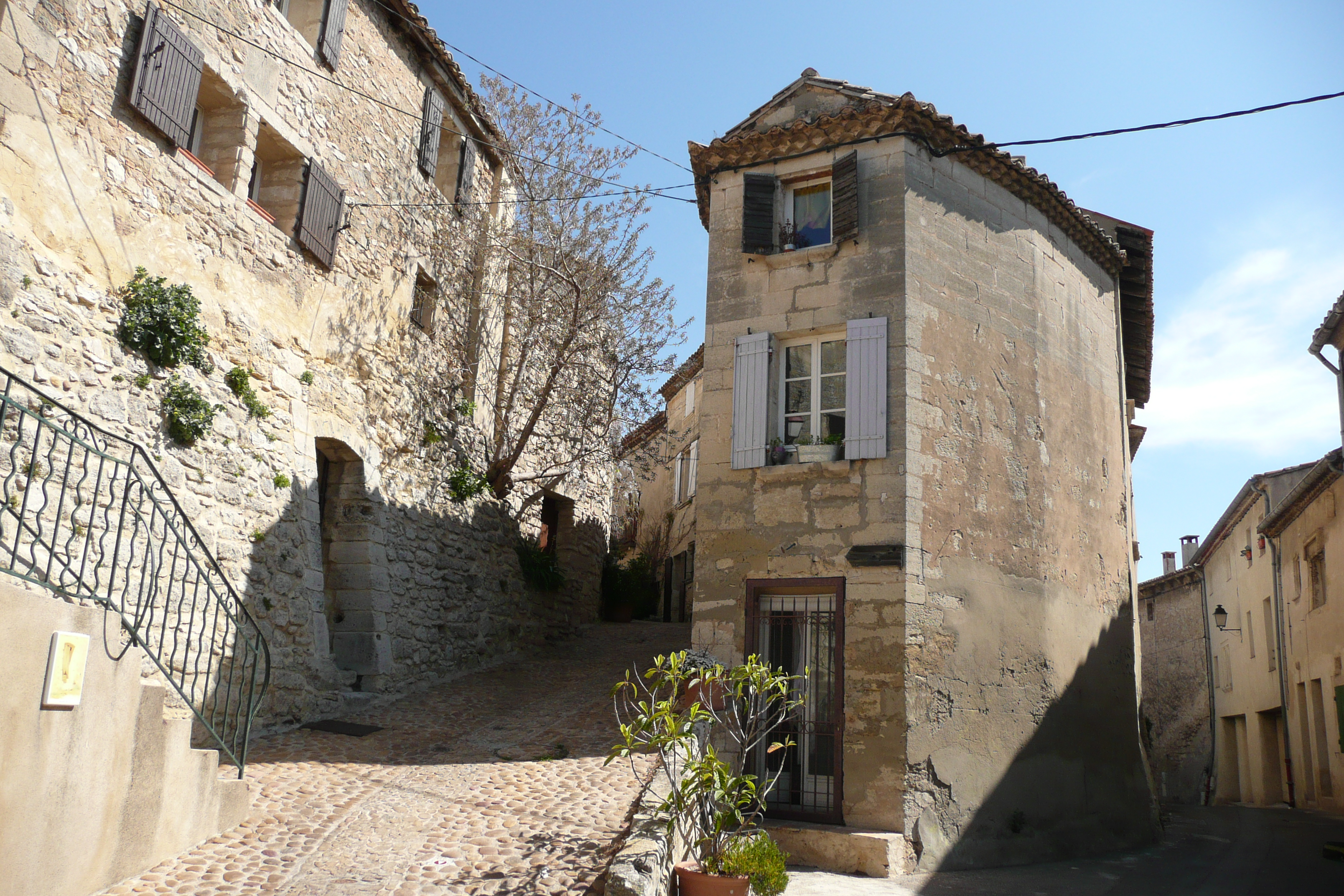
- Old town

- Coat of arms
- Location of Les Angles
- Location within France Location within Occitanie
- Coordinates: 43°57′19″N 4°46′02″E
- Country: France
- Region: Occitania
- Department: Gard
- Arrondissement: Nîmes
- Canton: Villeneuve-lès-Avignon
- Intercommunality: CA Grand Avignon

Government
  - Mayor (2022–2026): Paul Mely
- Area^{1}: 17.77 km^{2} (6.86 sq mi)
- Elevation: 60 m (200 ft)
- Highest elevation: 183 m (600 ft)
- Lowest elevation: 10 m (33 ft)
- Population (2023): 8,908
  - Density: 501.3/km^{2} (1,298/sq mi)
- Time zone: UTC+01:00 (CET)
  - Summer (DST): UTC+02:00 (CEST)
- INSEE/Postal code: 30011 /30133
- ^{1} French Land Register data, which excludes lakes, ponds, glaciers > 1 km^{2} (0.386 sq mi or 247 acres) and river estuaries.

Les Angles (French pronunciation: [le.z‿ɑ̃ɡl]; Occitan: Angles) is a commune in the Gard department in southern France.It is a suburb of the city of Avignon lying adjacent to its western side on the right bank of the Rhône river and is one of the constituent municipalities in the Vaucluse and the Gard of the urban agglomeration of Grand Avignon.

== Population ==
Historical population
Year	Pop.	±% p.a.
1968	3,505	—
1975	4,582	+3.90%
1982	5,570	+2.83%
1990	6,838	+2.60%
1999	7,578	+1.15%
2007	8,192	+0.98%
2012	8,318	+0.31%
2017	8,349	+0.07%
2023	8,908	+1.09%
Source: INSEE

== See also ==
- Communes of the Gard department
