= Jean Tortel =

French poet and essayist

Jean Tortel (4 April 1904, Saint-Saturnin-lès-Avignon, Vaucluse – 2 March 1993) was a 20th-century French poet and essayist.

== Works ==
- 1931: Cheveux bleus, Albert Messein, Paris
- 1946: Élémentaires, Mermod, Lausanne
- 1947: Paroles du poème, Robert Laffont, Paris
- 1965: Les Villes ouvertes, Éditions Gallimard, Paris
- 1968: Relations, Gallimard
- 1971: Limites du regard, Gallimard
- 1973: Instants qualifiés, Gallimard
- 1984: Feuilles tombées d'un discours, éditions Ryôan-ji, Marseille, Prix France Culture
- 1986: Arbitraires espaces, Flammarion, Paris
- 1989: Des corps attaqués, Flammarion
