= Saint-Saturnin-lès-Avignon =

Saint-Saturnin-lès-Avignon Sant Savornin d'Avinhon (Occitan)
- Commune
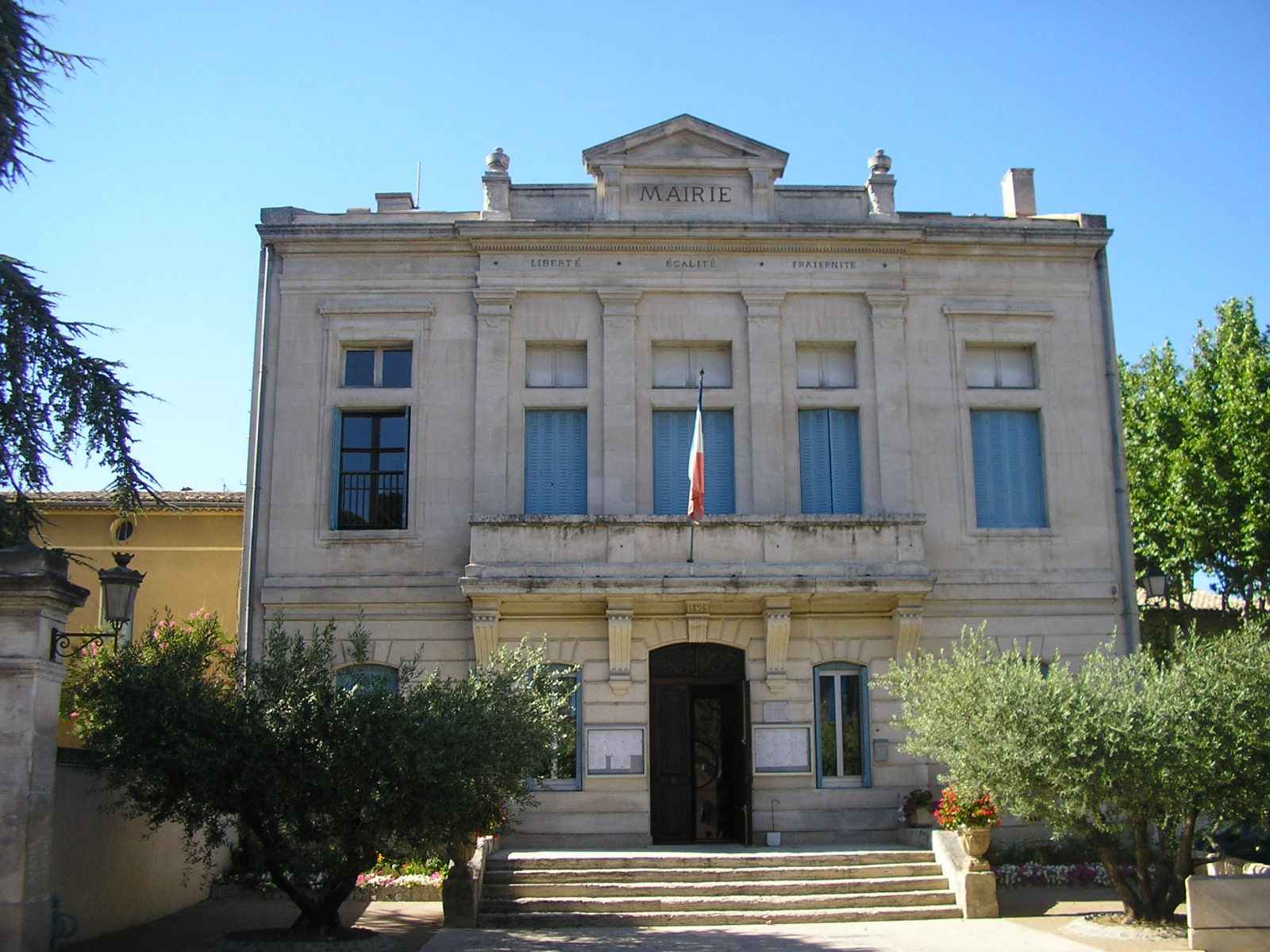
- Saint-Saturnin-lès-Avignon Town Hall

- Coat of arms
- Location of Saint-Saturnin-lès-Avignon
- Location within France Location within Provence-Alpes-Côte d'Azur
- Coordinates: 43°57′27″N 4°55′51″E
- Country: France
- Region: Provence-Alpes-Côte d'Azur
- Department: Vaucluse
- Arrondissement: Avignon
- Canton: Le Pontet
- Intercommunality: CA du Grand Avignon

Government
  - Mayor (2020–2026): Serge Malen
- Area^{1}: 6.25 km^{2} (2.41 sq mi)
- Elevation: 53 m (174 ft)
- Highest elevation: 117 m (384 ft)
- Lowest elevation: 34 m (112 ft)
- Population (2023): 5,206
  - Density: 833/km^{2} (2,160/sq mi)
- Demonym: Saint-Saturninois
- Time zone: UTC+01:00 (CET)
  - Summer (DST): UTC+02:00 (CEST)
- INSEE/Postal code: 84119 /84450
- Website: www.saintsaturnin.com
- ^{1} French Land Register data, which excludes lakes, ponds, glaciers > 1 km^{2} (0.386 sq mi or 247 acres) and river estuaries.

Saint-Saturnin-lès-Avignon (French pronunciation: [sɛ̃ satyʁnɛ̃ lɛ.z‿aviɲɔ̃], lit. "St Saturnin near Avignon"; Provençal Occitan: Sant Savornin d'Avinhon) is a commune in Greater Avignon in the Vaucluse department in the Provence-Alpes-Côte d'Azur region in Southeastern France.

== History ==
The poet Jean Tortel (1904–1993) was born in Saint-Saturnin-lès-Avignon.

== Population ==
To differentiate the commune's inhabitants from those of Saint-Saturnin-lès-Apt to the east, the first are called Saint-Saturninois (masculine) and Saint-Saturninoises (feminine) in French, whereas the latter are called Saturninois (masculine) and Saturninoises (feminine).

Historical population
Year	Pop.	±% p.a.
1968	1,828	—
1975	2,223	+2.83%
1982	2,664	+2.62%
1990	2,941	+1.24%
1999	3,835	+2.99%
2007	4,961	+3.27%
2012	4,845	−0.47%
2017	4,846	+0.00%
2023	5,206	+1.20%
Source: INSEE

== See also ==
- Communes of the Vaucluse department
