= Pujaut =

- Commune
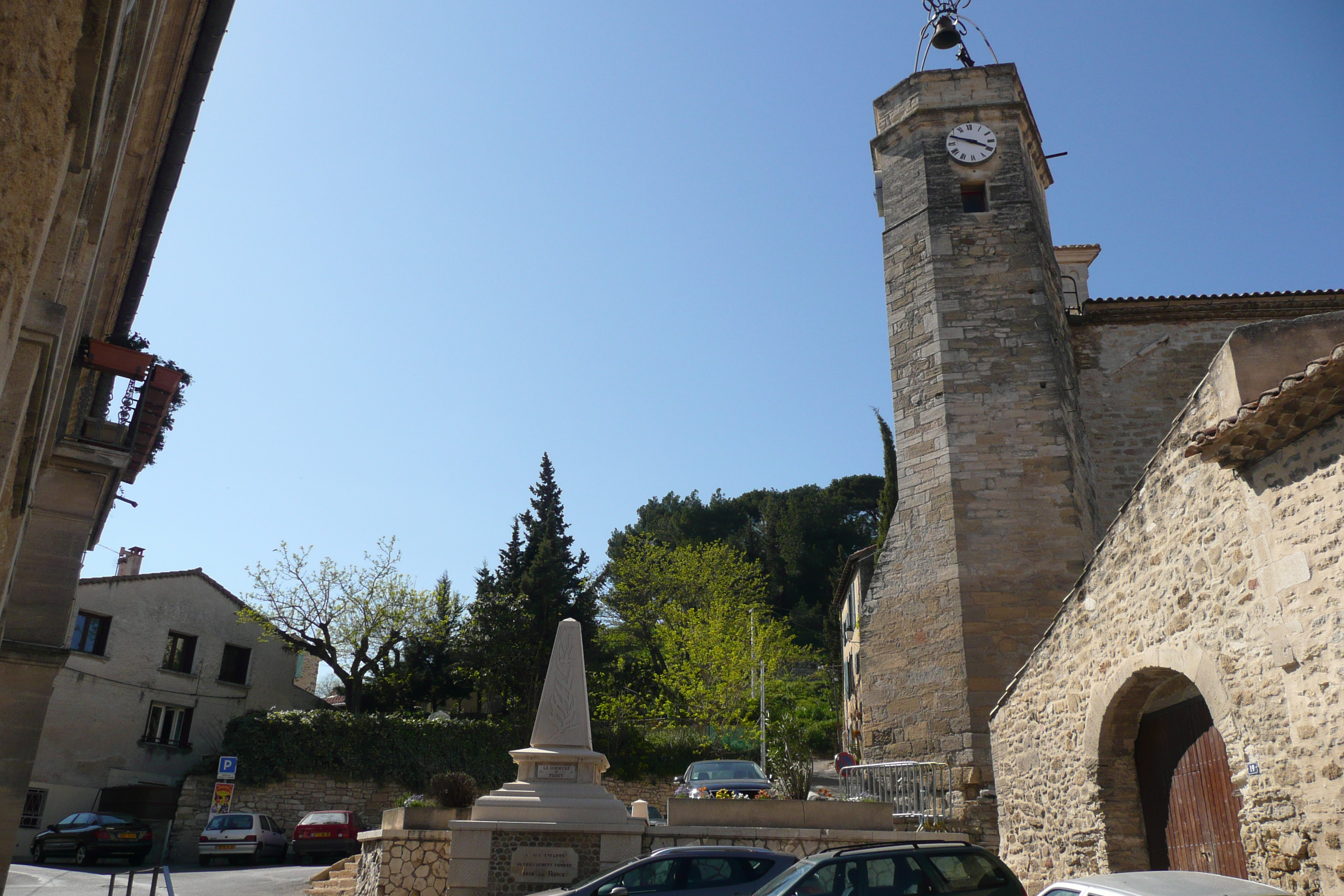
- The church of Pujaut

- Coat of arms
- Location of Pujaut
- Location within France Location within Occitanie
- Coordinates: 44°00′20″N 4°46′31″E
- Country: France
- Region: Occitania
- Department: Gard
- Arrondissement: Nîmes
- Canton: Villeneuve-lès-Avignon
- Intercommunality: CA Grand Avignon

Government
  - Mayor (2020–2026): Sandrine Soulier
- Area^{1}: 23.5 km^{2} (9.1 sq mi)
- Elevation: 110 m (360 ft)
- Highest elevation: 168 m (551 ft)
- Lowest elevation: 20 m (66 ft)
- Population (2023): 3,982
  - Density: 169/km^{2} (439/sq mi)
- Time zone: UTC+01:00 (CET)
  - Summer (DST): UTC+02:00 (CEST)
- INSEE/Postal code: 30209 /30131
- ^{1} French Land Register data, which excludes lakes, ponds, glaciers > 1 km^{2} (0.386 sq mi or 247 acres) and river estuaries.

Pujaut (French pronunciation: [pyʒo]; Occitan: Puejaut) is a commune in the Gard department in southern France. The village is situated on the south side of a small hill overlooking a flat plain that once formed the bed of a lake. The lake was drained at the beginning of the 17th century. The village is located 3.5 km west of the Rhône, 4.5 km north of Villeneuve-lès-Avignon and 5 km south of Roquemaure.

== Geography ==
=== Climate ===
Pujaut has a hot-summer Mediterranean climate (Köppen climate classification Csa). The average annual temperature in Pujaut is 14.6 °C (58.3 °F). The average annual rainfall is 672.8 mm (26.49 in) with November as the wettest month. The temperatures are highest on average in July, at around 23.9 °C (75.0 °F), and lowest in January, at around 6.3 °C (43.3 °F). The highest temperature ever recorded in Pujaut was 41.1 °C (106.0 °F) on 28 June 2019; the coldest temperature ever recorded was −10.3 °C (13.5 °F) on 2 January 2002.

Climate data for Pujaut (1991−2020 normals, extremes 1991−present)
Month	Jan	Feb	Mar	Apr	May	Jun	Jul	Aug	Sep	Oct	Nov	Dec	Year
Record high °C (°F)	20.8 (69.4)	24.2 (75.6)	26.7 (80.1)	30.4 (86.7)	33.9 (93.0)	41.1 (106.0)	39.9 (103.8)	41.0 (105.8)	35.3 (95.5)	31.0 (87.8)	23.2 (73.8)	19.8 (67.6)	41.1 (106.0)
Mean daily maximum °C (°F)	10.5 (50.9)	12.2 (54.0)	16.4 (61.5)	19.4 (66.9)	23.6 (74.5)	28.0 (82.4)	30.8 (87.4)	30.6 (87.1)	25.5 (77.9)	20.6 (69.1)	14.4 (57.9)	10.9 (51.6)	20.2 (68.4)
Daily mean °C (°F)	6.3 (43.3)	7.2 (45.0)	10.6 (51.1)	13.2 (55.8)	17.2 (63.0)	21.3 (70.3)	23.9 (75.0)	23.6 (74.5)	19.3 (66.7)	15.3 (59.5)	10.1 (50.2)	6.8 (44.2)	14.6 (58.3)
Mean daily minimum °C (°F)	2.0 (35.6)	2.2 (36.0)	4.7 (40.5)	7.1 (44.8)	10.8 (51.4)	14.7 (58.5)	17.0 (62.6)	16.7 (62.1)	13.0 (55.4)	10.1 (50.2)	5.7 (42.3)	2.7 (36.9)	8.9 (48.0)
Record low °C (°F)	−10.3 (13.5)	−7.5 (18.5)	−9.2 (15.4)	−3.7 (25.3)	1.7 (35.1)	5.7 (42.3)	7.3 (45.1)	7.6 (45.7)	3.7 (38.7)	−2.5 (27.5)	−7.4 (18.7)	−9.0 (15.8)	−10.3 (13.5)
Average precipitation mm (inches)	53.3 (2.10)	35.3 (1.39)	38.2 (1.50)	60.8 (2.39)	51.9 (2.04)	39.4 (1.55)	31.4 (1.24)	36.9 (1.45)	93.2 (3.67)	88.2 (3.47)	95.9 (3.78)	48.3 (1.90)	672.8 (26.49)
Average precipitation days (≥ 1.0 mm)	5.7	4.5	4.4	6.5	6.0	4.1	3.1	3.5	5.3	6.3	7.9	5.6	62.8
Source: Météo-France

== Population ==
Historical population

Year	Pop.	±% p.a.
1793	906	—
1800	998	+1.39%
1806	1,057	+0.96%
1821	1,178	+0.73%
1831	1,297	+0.97%
1836	1,362	+0.98%
1841	1,390	+0.41%
1846	1,546	+2.15%
1851	1,533	−0.17%
1856	1,606	+0.93%
1861	1,624	+0.22%
1866	1,601	−0.28%
1872	1,546	−0.58%
1876	1,437	−1.81%
1881	1,152	−4.32%
1886	1,093	−1.05%
1891	1,101	+0.15%
1896	1,066	−0.64%
1901	1,057	−0.17%

Year	Pop.	±% p.a.
1906	1,090	+0.62%
1911	1,094	+0.07%
1921	991	−0.98%
1926	985	−0.12%
1931	1,061	+1.50%
1936	1,037	−0.46%
1946	1,064	+0.26%
1954	1,038	−0.31%
1962	1,083	+0.53%
1968	1,219	+1.99%
1975	1,533	+3.33%
1982	2,465	+7.02%
1990	2,911	+2.10%
1999	3,242	+1.20%
2007	3,900	+2.34%
2012	4,068	+0.85%
2017	4,136	+0.33%
2023	3,982	−0.63%

Source: EHESS and INSEE (1968-2023)

== See also ==
- Communes of the Gard department
