= Jean-Michel Ferrand =

French politician (1942–2025)

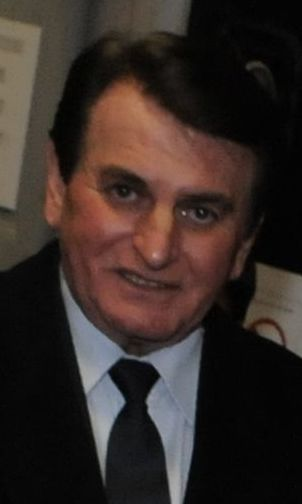
- Ferrand in 2009

Member of the National Assembly for Vaucluse's 3rd constituency
- In office 23 June 1988 – 19 June 2012
- Succeeded by: Marion Maréchal-Le Pen

Personal details
- Born: 31 August 1942 Gardanne, Bouches-du-Rhône, France
- Died: 27 September 2025 (aged 83)
- Political party: Union for a Popular Movement

Jean-Michel Ferrand (31 August 1942 – 27 September 2025) was a French politician who was a member of the National Assembly. He represented the Vaucluse department, and was a member of the Union for a Popular Movement. He lost his seat in the run-off of the parliamentary elections of 17 June 2012 against Marion Maréchal-Le Pen. Jean-Michel Ferrand was well known for his gaudy appearance and meridional loquacity. Ferrand died on 27 September 2025, at the age of 83.

== Points of view ==
- He was a member of the Popular Right.
- He was a partisan of the death penalty for terrorism.
