= Canton of Le Pontet =

Coordinates: 43.96°N 4.86°E

- Canton
- Situation of the canton of Le Pontet in the department of Vaucluse
- Country: France
- Region: Provence-Alpes-Côte d'Azur
- Department: Vaucluse
- No. of communes: {{{nbcomm}}}
- Population (2023): 40,340
- INSEE code: 8414

The canton of Le Pontet is an administrative division of the Vaucluse department, in southeastern France. It was created at the French canton reorganisation which came into effect in March 2015. Its seat is in Le Pontet.

It consists of the following communes:

1. Jonquerettes
2. Le Pontet
3. Saint-Saturnin-lès-Avignon
4. Vedène
5. Velleron
