= Canton of Villeneuve-lès-Avignon =

Coordinates: 43.97°N 4.79°E

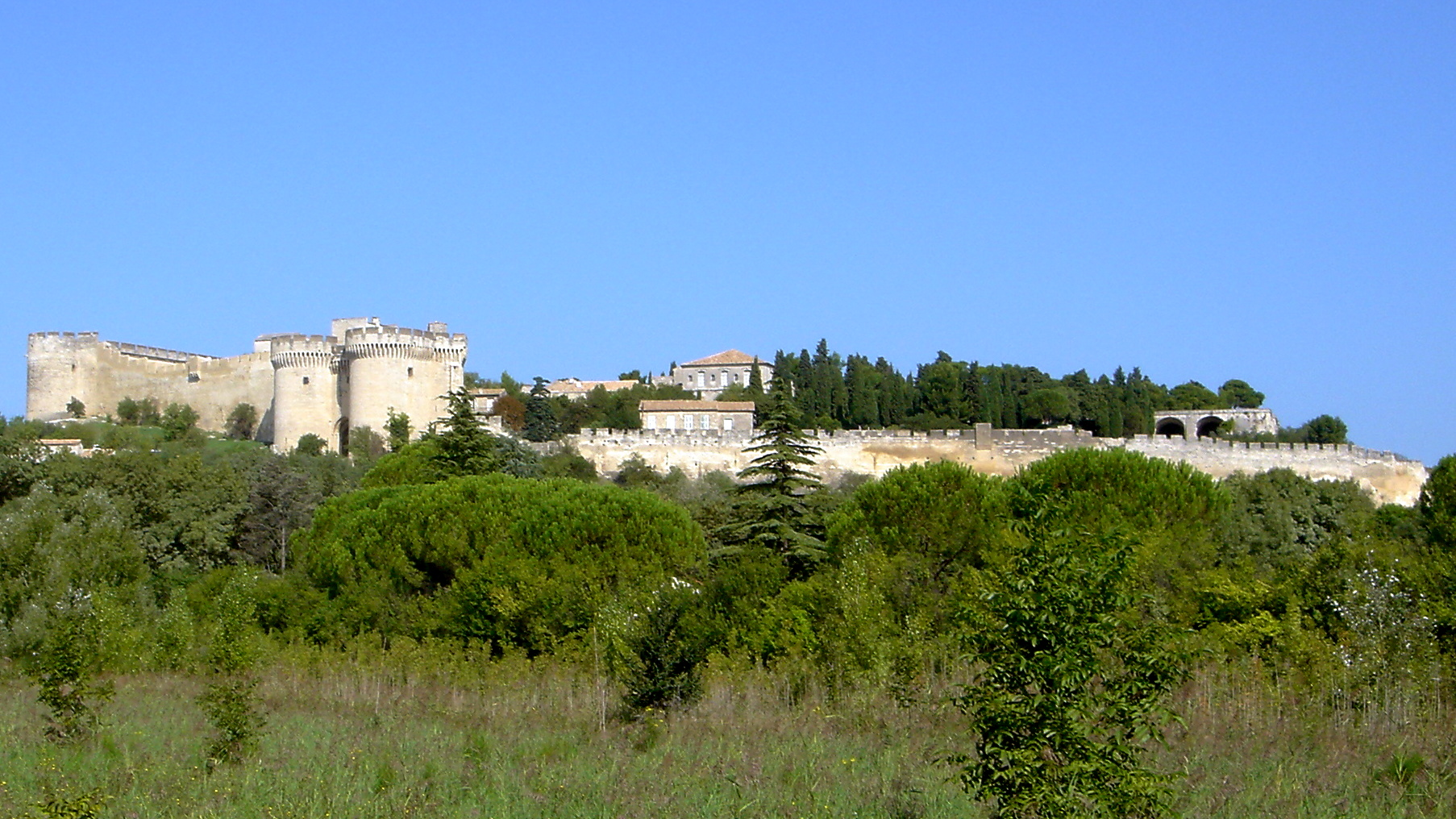
Fort Saint-André

The canton of Villeneuve-lès-Avignon is an administrative division of the Gard department, southern France. Its borders were not modified at the French canton reorganisation which came into effect in March 2015. Its seat is in Villeneuve-lès-Avignon.

It consists of the following communes:

1. Les Angles
2. Pujaut
3. Rochefort-du-Gard
4. Saze
5. Villeneuve-lès-Avignon
