= Canton of Avignon-3 =

Coordinates: 43.94°N 4.83°E

- Canton
- Situation of the canton of Avignon-3 in the department of Vaucluse
- Country: France
- Region: Provence-Alpes-Côte d'Azur
- Department: Vaucluse
- No. of communes: {{{nbcomm}}}
- Population (2023): 39,052
- INSEE code: 8404

The canton of Avignon-3 is an administrative division of the Vaucluse department, in southeastern France. It was created at the French canton reorganisation which came into effect in March 2015. Its seat is in Avignon.

It consists of the following communes:

1. Avignon (partly)
2. Morières-lès-Avignon
