= Saze =

- Commune
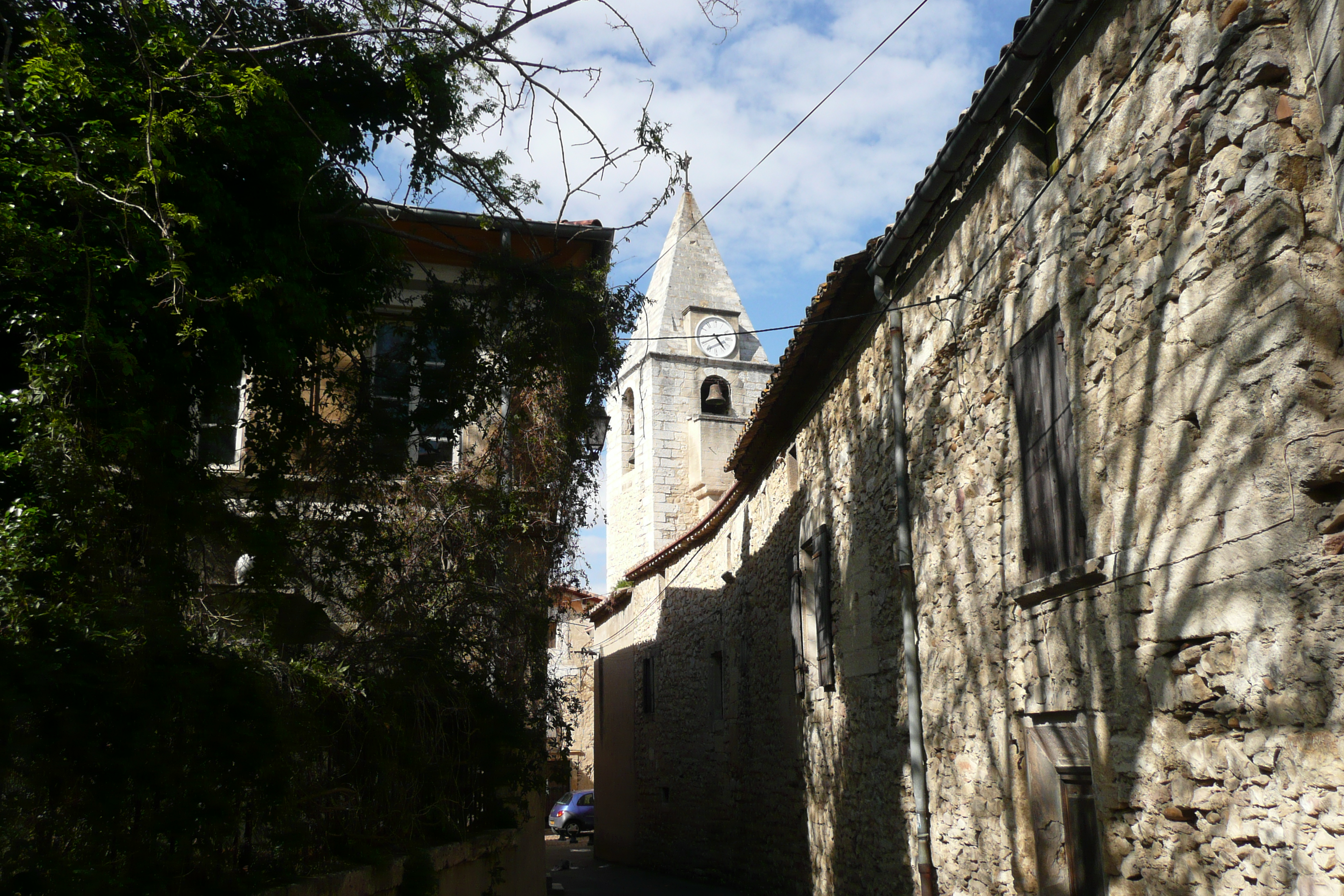
- The church in Saze

- Coat of arms
- Location of Saze
- Location within France Location within Occitanie
- Coordinates: 43°56′33″N 4°40′56″E
- Country: France
- Region: Occitania
- Department: Gard
- Arrondissement: Nîmes
- Canton: Villeneuve-lès-Avignon
- Intercommunality: CA Grand Avignon

Government
  - Mayor (2020–2026): Yvan Bourelly
- Area^{1}: 12.6 km^{2} (4.9 sq mi)
- Elevation: 65 m (213 ft)
- Highest elevation: 195 m (640 ft)
- Lowest elevation: 54 m (177 ft)
- Population (2023): 2,096
  - Density: 166/km^{2} (431/sq mi)
- Time zone: UTC+01:00 (CET)
  - Summer (DST): UTC+02:00 (CEST)
- INSEE/Postal code: 30315 /30650
- ^{1} French Land Register data, which excludes lakes, ponds, glaciers > 1 km^{2} (0.386 sq mi or 247 acres) and river estuaries.

Saze (French pronunciation: [saz]; Occitan: Sase) is a commune in the Gard department in southern France.

== Population ==
Historical population
Year	Pop.	±% p.a.
1968	513	—
1975	679	+4.09%
1982	1,102	+7.16%
1990	1,321	+2.29%
1999	1,456	+1.09%
2007	1,749	+2.32%
2012	1,919	+1.87%
2017	2,037	+1.20%
2023	2,096	+0.48%
Source: INSEE

== See also ==
- Communes of the Gard department
