= Brune Poirson =

French politician (born 1982)

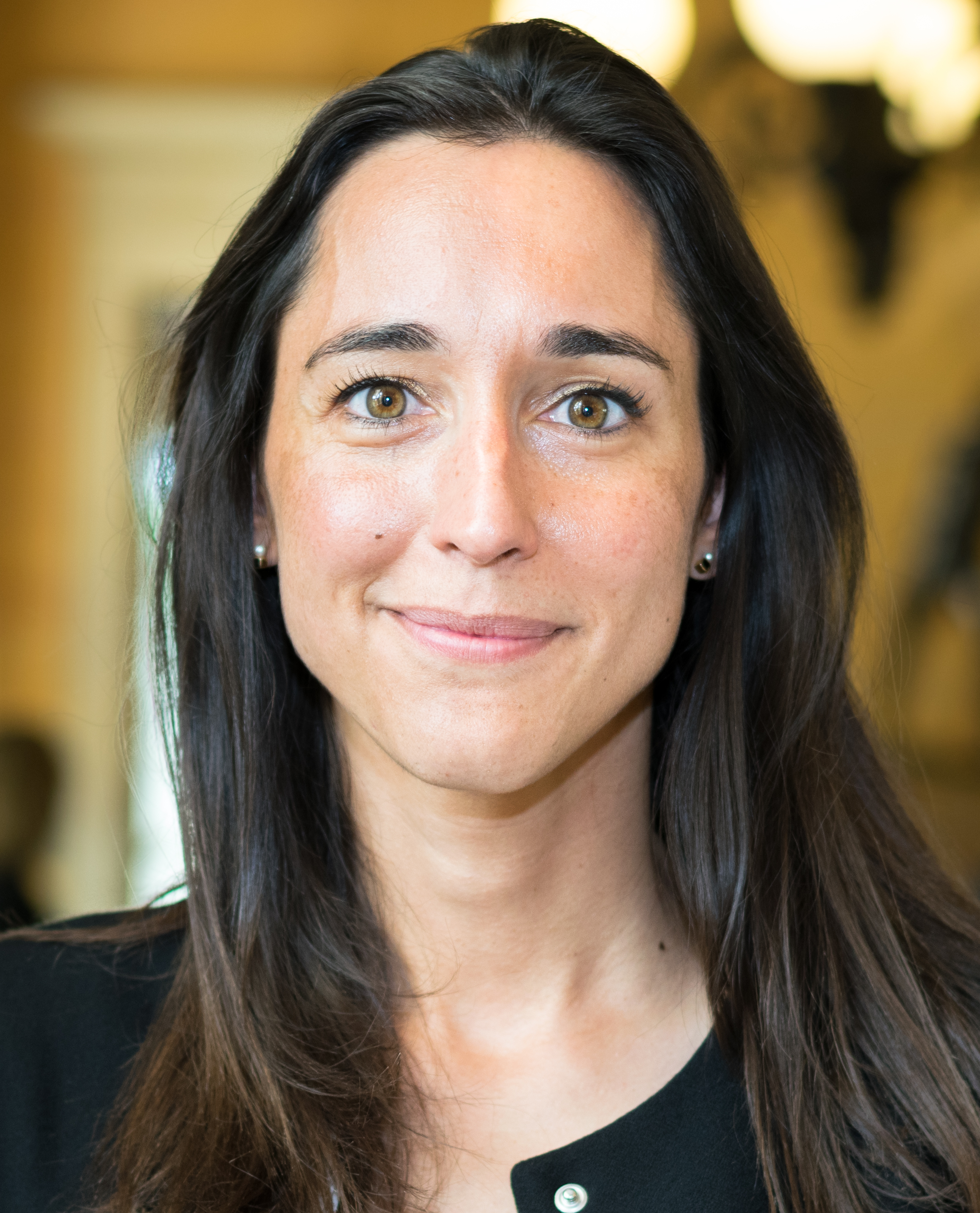
- Poirson in 2017

Secretary of State for Ecological and Solidary Transition
- In office 21 June 2017 – 3 July 2020
- Prime Minister: Édouard Philippe

Member of the National Assembly for Vaucluse's 3rd constituency
- In office 4 August 2020 – 5 April 2021
- Preceded by: Adrien Morenas
- Succeeded by: Adrien Morenas
- In office 21 June 2017 – 21 July 2017
- Preceded by: Marion Maréchal
- Succeeded by: Adrien Morenas

Personal details
- Born: 1 September 1982 (age 44) Washington, DC, US
- Party: La République En Marche!
- Education: Sciences Po Aix; London School of Economics; John F. Kennedy School of Government

Brune Poirson (French pronunciation: [bʁyn pwaʁsɔ̃]; born 1 September 1982) is a French politician of La République En Marche! (LREM) who served as Secretary of State to the Minister of Ecological and Solidary Transition in the government of Prime Minister Édouard Philippe from 2017 until 2020.

== Early life and education ==
Born in Washington, DC, Poirson's mother was a paintings conservator and restorer and her father a computer consultant for the World Bank. She grew up with her two little brothers in Apt in Vaucluse, where she did part of her schooling from nursery school, in the public schools. She attended lycée in Marseille.

Poirson studied at Sciences Po Aix in Aix-en-Provence, London School of Economics and Harvard Kennedy School of Government.

== Professional career ==
Poirson's professional career began in London, where she was a legislative assistant to a Labour Member of Parliament and researcher at Nesta for about two years.

In London Poirson met Sam Pitroda, then minister of the government of Manmohan Singh in India. She joined his cabinet in New Delhi in 2009. After that, she started working for the French Development Agency, where she coordinated projects for sustainable urban development and biodiversity conservation.

In 2012, Poirson and her partner created the CITRIX sustainable urban development working group, of which Hubert Védrine, Brice Lalonde and Sam Pitroda are stakeholders.

Poirson was then recruited by Veolia as director of sustainable development and social responsibility of one of its subsidiaries, Veolia Water India, in New Delhi. In this role, she worked on drinking water distribution projects in the slums of large Indian megacities, particularly in Karnataka and Nagpur. Poirson then continued her career in the United States, in Boston, until 2016, where she worked in a green technology incubator.

Poirson is a member of the 2017 promotion of the "Young Leaders" programme of the France China Foundation.

== Political career ==
=== Member of the National Assembly ===
Poirson returned to France in 2016 to engage in Emmanuel Macron's newly-launched political movement, En Marche! (later renamed La République En Marche!).

In the 2017 legislative election, she was one of two members of La République En Marche! elected to the National Assembly in the Vaucluse department alongside Jean-François Cesarini in the 1st constituency. She won the 3rd constituency seat on 18 June 2017 with a thin majority of 421 votes against National Front (FN) candidate Hervé de Lépinau, who would eventually go on to win the seat in the 2022 election. Outgoing FN representative Marion Maréchal had declined to run for a second term in office.

=== Member of the Government ===
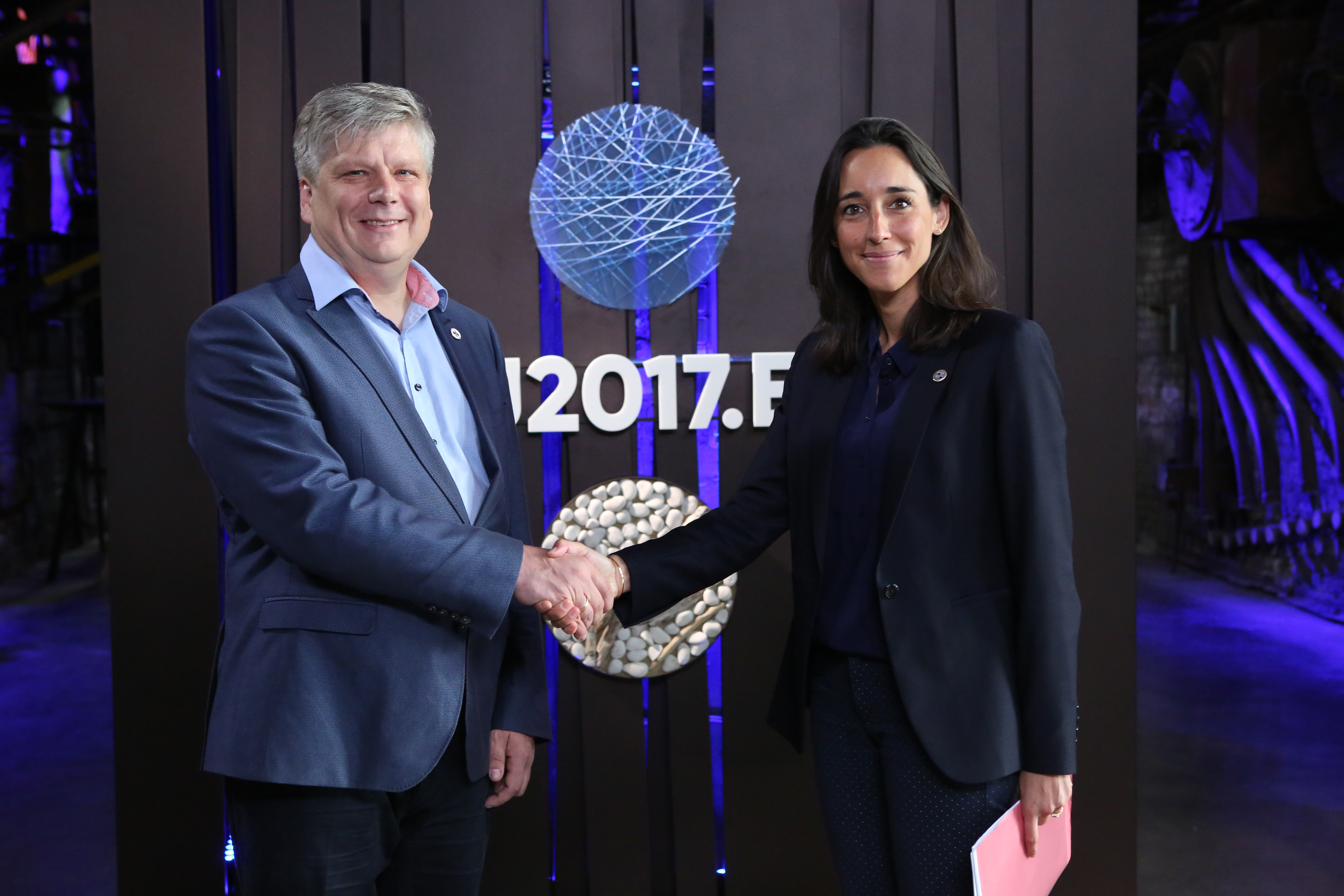
Brune Poirson and Estonian Minister of the Environment Siim Valmar Kiisler in 2017

On 21 June 2017 Poirson was appointed Secretary of State to the Minister of State, Minister of Ecological and Solidary Transition, former environmental activist and television host Nicolas Hulot, in the second government of Édouard Philippe. She left her seat as a member of the National Assembly to her substitute Adrien Morenas.

Upon taking office, Hulot announced that Poirson would be in charge of policies related to the sea, biodiversity and the ocean; he would also delegate her the questions discussed at a European level. She attended the vast majority of the Councils of Energy and Environment Ministers, covering topics as diverse as the circular economy, the reform of the European electricity market, the governance of Energy union and climate, as well as the carbon emission trading.

On 14 March 2020, Poirson was the second French government official to test positive for COVID-19. She left the executive on 3 July 2020, at the end of the second Philippe government. She subsequently returned to the National Assembly until her resignation in 2021.

== Career after politics ==
In 2021, Poirson was appointed advisor on sustainable development to Accor CEO Sébastien Bazin.
