= Jonquerettes =

Jonquerettes Joncairetas (Occitan)
- Commune
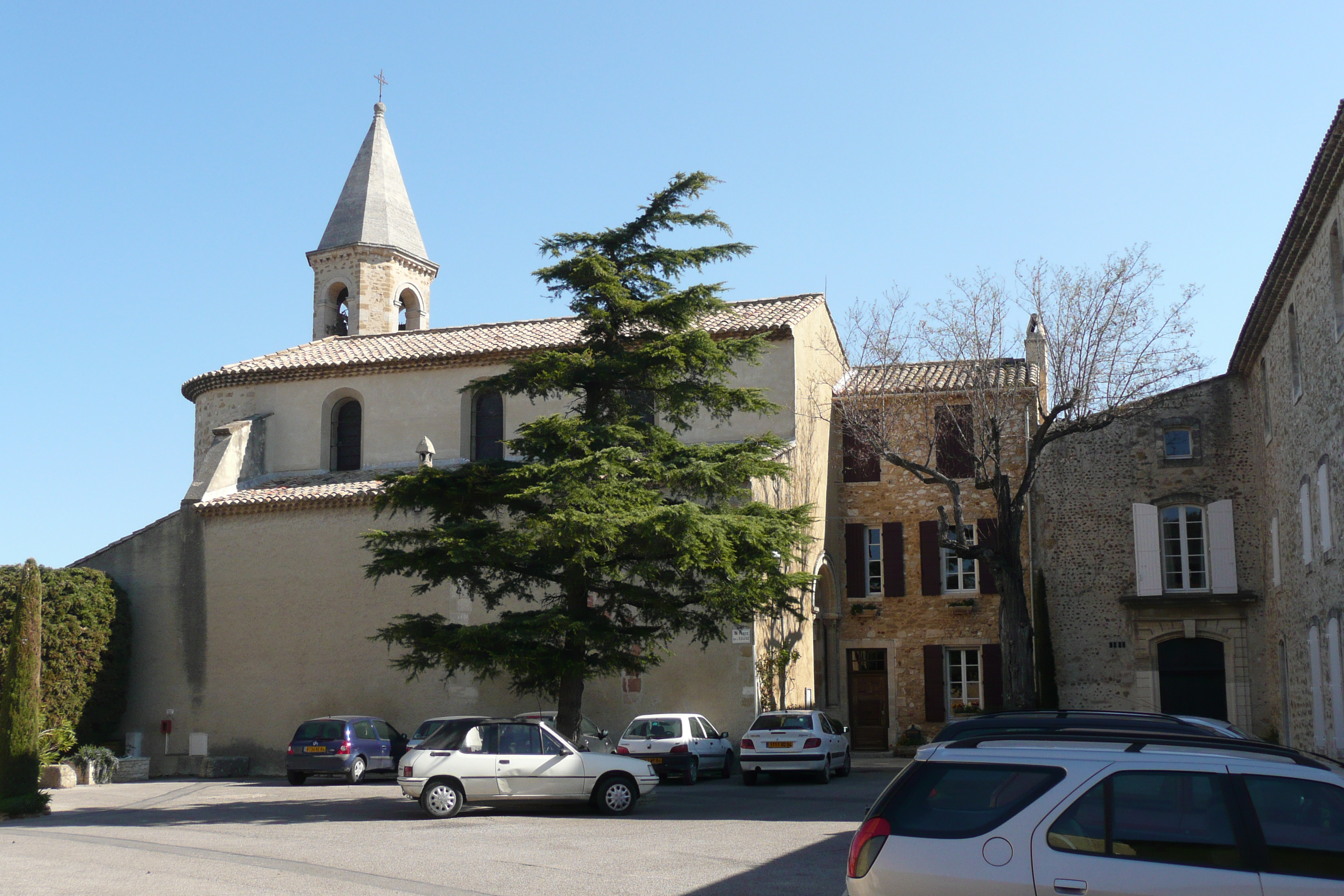
- The church in Jonquerettes

- Coat of arms
- Location of Jonquerettes
- Location within France Location within Provence-Alpes-Côte d'Azur
- Coordinates: 43°56′53″N 4°56′01″E
- Country: France
- Region: Provence-Alpes-Côte d'Azur
- Department: Vaucluse
- Arrondissement: Avignon
- Canton: Le Pontet
- Intercommunality: CA Grand Avignon

Government
  - Mayor (2020–2026): Daniel Bellegarde
- Area^{1}: 2.57 km^{2} (0.99 sq mi)
- Elevation: 120 m (390 ft)
- Highest elevation: 119 m (390 ft)
- Lowest elevation: 38 m (125 ft)
- Population (2023): 1,606
  - Density: 625/km^{2} (1,620/sq mi)
- Time zone: UTC+01:00 (CET)
  - Summer (DST): UTC+02:00 (CEST)
- INSEE/Postal code: 84055 /84450
- ^{1} French Land Register data, which excludes lakes, ponds, glaciers > 1 km^{2} (0.386 sq mi or 247 acres) and river estuaries.

Jonquerettes (French pronunciation: [ʒɔ̃kʁɛt]; Occitan: Joncairetas) is a commune in the Vaucluse department in the Provence-Alpes-Côte d'Azur region in Southeastern France and a suburb of Avignon. As of 2023, the population of the commune was 1,606.

Communes of Grand Avignon. Red:Vaucluse. Brown: Gard

The commune (5) is one of the constituent municipalities in the Vaucluse and the Gard of the urban agglomeration of Grand Avignon.

== See also ==
- Communes of the Vaucluse department
