= Athlétic Club Vedène Le Pontet =

AC Vedène Le Pontet
- Full name: Athlétic Club Vedène Le Pontet
- Founded: 2020
- Ground: Stade de la Banastière
- Capacity: 1000
- League: Regional 1, Mediterranée
- 2023–24: Regional 1, Mediterranée 9th of 14th
Home colours

AC Vedène Le Pontet is a football club based in Vedène, Vaucluse, France. They play at Stade de la Banastière. They were formed as a result of a merger in 2020 by Athlétic Club Vedène (formed 1935) and elements of US Le Pontet Grand Avignon 84 (formed 1980).

== Honours ==
=== League honours ===
- Regional 2, Mediterranée
  - Winners: 2021/22

=== Cup honours ===
As Athlétic Club Vedène

- Coupe Rhone Durance
  - Winners: 1968 & 2012
- Coupe de l'Espérance
  - Winners: 1971
- Coupe Roumagoux
  - Winners: 1991
  - Runners up: 1992
- Coupe Ulysee Fabre
  - Winners: 1977 & 1999

== Records ==
- Coupe de France best performance: Fifth Qualifying Round Mediterranée
- Highest League Position : 8th in Regional 1 Mediterranée 2022/23
