= Rochefort-du-Gard =

- Commune
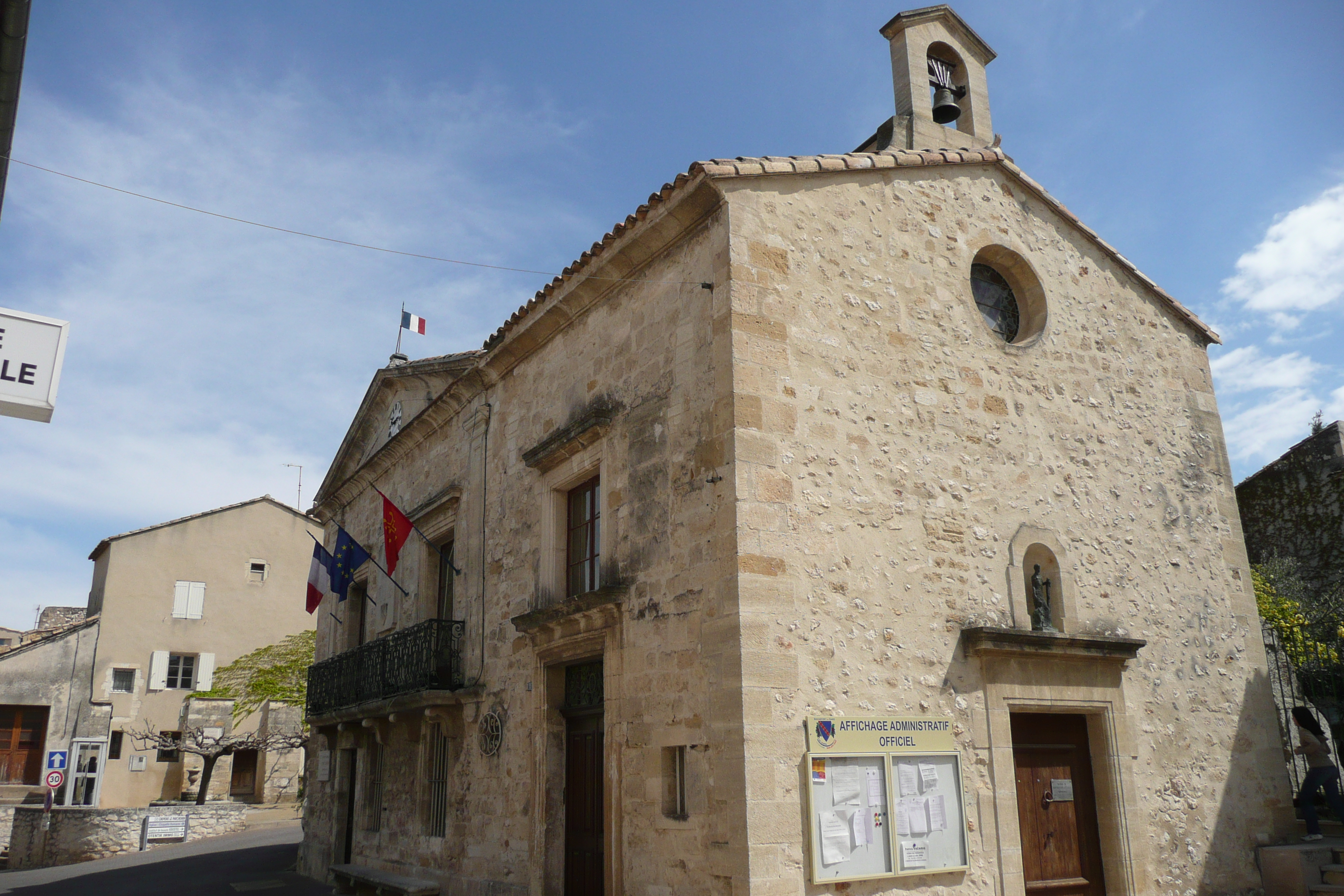
- Town hall

- Coat of arms
- Location of Rochefort-du-Gard
- Location within France Location within Occitanie
- Coordinates: 43°58′30″N 4°41′27″E
- Country: France
- Region: Occitania
- Department: Gard
- Arrondissement: Nîmes
- Canton: Villeneuve-lès-Avignon
- Intercommunality: CA Grand Avignon

Government
  - Mayor (2020–2026): Rémy Bachevalier
- Area^{1}: 34.03 km^{2} (13.14 sq mi)
- Elevation: 56 m (184 ft)
- Highest elevation: 267 m (876 ft)
- Lowest elevation: 48 m (157 ft)
- Population (2023): 8,117
  - Density: 238.5/km^{2} (617.8/sq mi)
- Time zone: UTC+01:00 (CET)
  - Summer (DST): UTC+02:00 (CEST)
- INSEE/Postal code: 30217 /30650
- ^{1} French Land Register data, which excludes lakes, ponds, glaciers > 1 km^{2} (0.386 sq mi or 247 acres) and river estuaries.

Rochefort-du-Gard (Occitan: Ròcha-fòrt del Jardin) is a commune in the Gard department in southern France.

== Population ==
Historical population
Year	Pop.	±% p.a.
1968	910	—
1975	1,128	+3.12%
1982	2,018	+8.66%
1990	4,107	+9.29%
1999	5,821	+3.95%
2007	6,816	+1.99%
2012	7,499	+1.93%
2017	7,532	+0.09%
2023	8,117	+1.25%
Source: INSEE

== Culture ==
Rochefort-du-Gard is integrated into Occitanie but naturally rooted in Provence. It depends on the economic area of Avignon.

With its 42 associations, it enjoys a great number of cultural and sporting events. Nearly 3000 people come to see the "Grand Aïoli," held on the Monday after the village festival.

== Sights ==
Rochefort-du-Gard is well known for its well-preserved historic monuments:

- Le Castelas, a fully renovated Romanesque chapel from the tenth century, which towers above the village
- The Sanctuary of Notre Dame, built under Charlemagne's rule in 798. The chapel, the nave, the choir, the baroque altar, the museum of thanksgiving plaques, the hall of echoes, and the Grand Calvary are all worth the visit
- The church of Saint Bardulphe, a neo-Gothic parish church which was renovated in 1981 and 1988
- The town hall, a former chapel built from 1729 to 1934
- The wash-house with its Doric columns. It was completed in 1807 and entirely renovated in 1999

== See also ==
- Communes of the Gard department
