= Canton of Avignon-Est =

Coordinates: 43°56′47″N 4°51′40″E

Avignon-Est
- Former canton
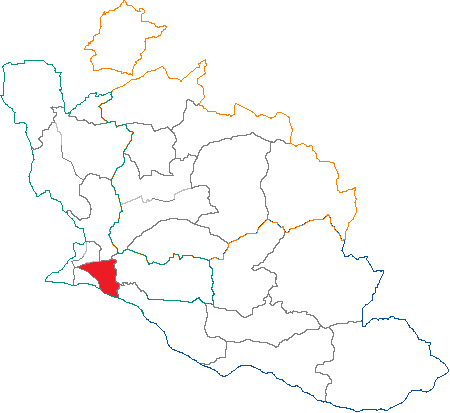
- Country: France
- Region: Provence-Alpes-Côte d'Azur
- Department: Vaucluse
- No. of communes: {{{nbcomm}}}
- Disbanded: 2015
- Population (2012): 35,935

The canton of Avignon-Est is a French former administrative division in the department of Vaucluse and region Provence-Alpes-Côte d'Azur. It had 35,935 inhabitants (2012). It was disbanded following the French canton reorganisation which came into effect in March 2015.

== Composition ==
The communes in the canton of Avignon-Est:

- Avignon (partly, including Montfavet)
- Morières-lès-Avignon
