= Canton of Avignon-Sud =

Coordinates: 43.9500°N 4.8167°E

Avignon-Sud
- Former canton
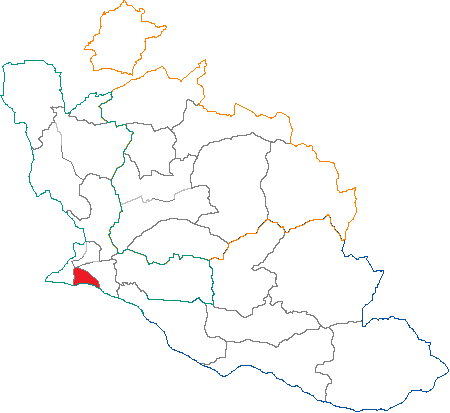
- Country: France
- Region: Provence-Alpes-Côte d'Azur
- Department: Vaucluse
- No. of communes: {{{nbcomm}}}
- Disbanded: 2015
- Population (2012): 19,306

The canton of Avignon-Sud is a French former administrative division in the department of Vaucluse and region Provence-Alpes-Côte d'Azur. It had 19,306 inhabitants (2012). It was disbanded following the French canton reorganisation which came into effect in March 2015. It comprised part of the communes of Avignon.
