= Adrien Morenas =

French politician

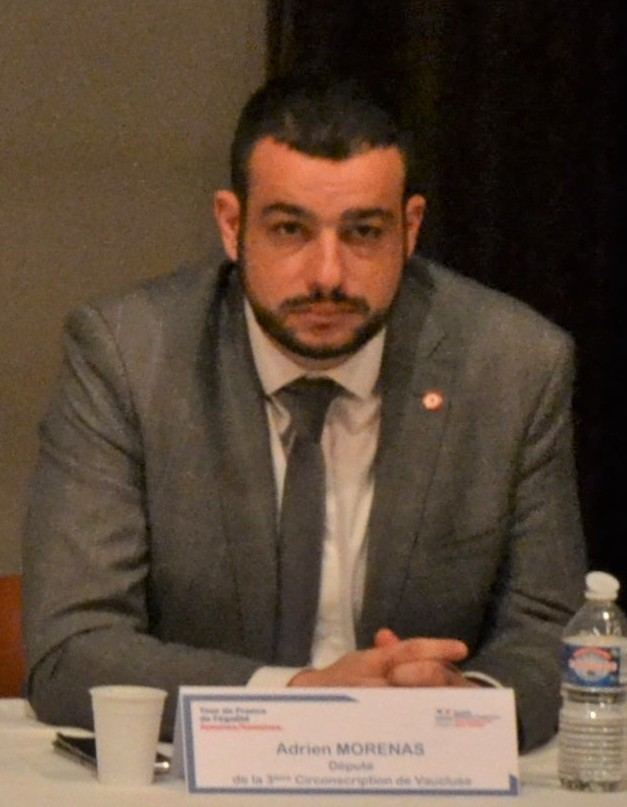

Member of the National Assembly for Vaucluse's 3rd constituency
- In office 22 July 2017 – 3 August 2020
- Preceded by: Brune Poirson
- Succeeded by: Brune Poirson
- In office 6 April 2021 – 21 June 2022
- Preceded by: Brune Poirson
- Succeeded by: Hervé de Lépinau

Personal details
- Born: 1 January 1982 (age 44) Carpentras, France
- Party: La République En Marche!

Adrien Morenas (born 1 January 1982) is a French osteopath and politician of La République En Marche! (LREM) who served as a member of the National Assembly from 2017 until 2020, and again fron 2021 to 2022, as a substitute for Brune Poirson representing Vaucluse's 3rd constituency.

== Early life and education ==
Formerly in the military, Morenas served for more than eight years in the French Navy, including from 2001 to 2006 on the aircraft carrier Charles de Gaulle.

In 2008, Morenas left the Navy and became a technical inspector in a company selling civilian safety equipment. At 30, he resumed his studies to become an osteopath.

== Political career ==
Replacing Brune Poirson, Morenas became a member of the National Assembly for Vaucluse's 3rd constituency, following Poirson's appointment to the government on July 22, 2017.

In parliament, Morenas served on the Committee on Sustainable Development and Spatial Planning. In addition to his committee assignments, he was part of the French parliamentary friendship groups with Finland, New Zealand and the United Arab Emirates.

In July 2019, Morenas voted in favour of the French ratification of the European Union’s Comprehensive Economic and Trade Agreement (CETA) with Canada.

At the end of Poirson's term as secretary, she returned to the assembly and Morenas left on 3 August 2020.

Poirson again left the assembly on 5 April 2021, Morenas returned on 6 April 2021 and served to the 2022 election.

At the 2022 election, Morenas lost the seat to Hervé de Lépinau.

== See also ==
- 2017 French legislative election
