= Morières-lès-Avignon =

Morières-lès-Avignon Morieras d'Avinhon (Occitan)
- Commune
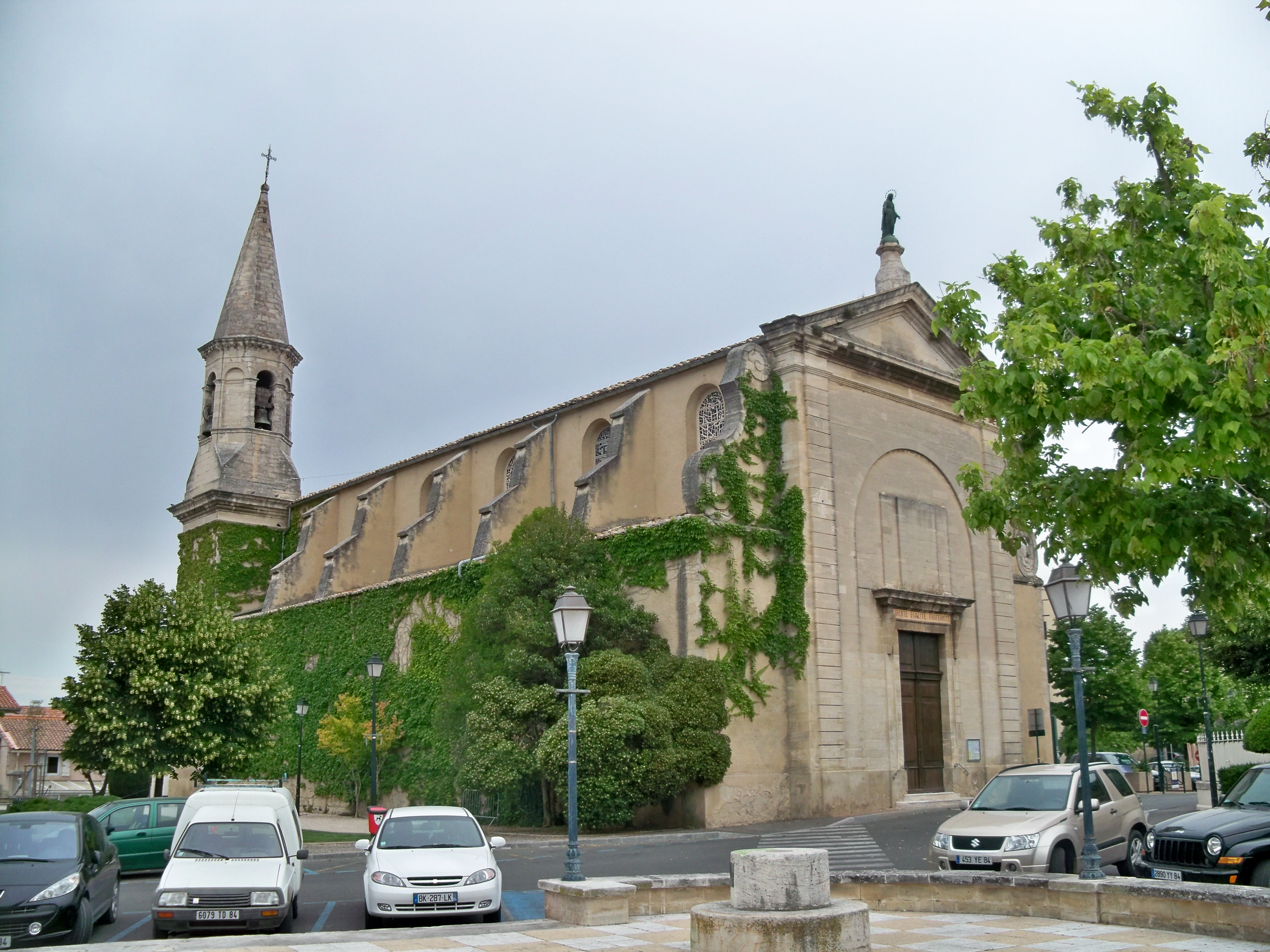
- Church of Morières-lès-Avignon

- Coat of arms
- Location of Morières-lès-Avignon
- Location within France Location within Provence-Alpes-Côte d'Azur
- Coordinates: 43°56′33″N 4°54′19″E
- Country: France
- Region: Provence-Alpes-Côte d'Azur
- Department: Vaucluse
- Arrondissement: Avignon
- Canton: Avignon-3
- Intercommunality: CA Grand Avignon

Government
  - Mayor (2020–2026): Grégoire Souque
- Area^{1}: 10.35 km^{2} (4.00 sq mi)
- Elevation: 41 m (135 ft)
- Highest elevation: 116 m (381 ft)
- Lowest elevation: 25 m (82 ft)
- Population (2023): 9,019
  - Density: 871.4/km^{2} (2,257/sq mi)
- Time zone: UTC+01:00 (CET)
  - Summer (DST): UTC+02:00 (CEST)
- INSEE/Postal code: 84081 /84310
- ^{1} French Land Register data, which excludes lakes, ponds, glaciers > 1 km^{2} (0.386 sq mi or 247 acres) and river estuaries.

Morières-lès-Avignon (French pronunciation: [mɔʁjɛʁ lɛ.z‿aviɲɔ̃], literally Morières near Avignon; Provençal: Morieras d'Avinhon) is a commune in the Vaucluse department in the Provence-Alpes-Côte d'Azur region in Southeastern France. It is located just east of Avignon, with a population of 8,563 as of 2018. It is one of the constituent municipalities (6) in the Vaucluse and the Gard of the urban agglomeration of Grand Avignon.

Communes of Grand Avignon. Red:Vaucluse. Brown: Gard

Morières-lès-Avignon is twinned with Caldicot, United Kingdom.

== Population ==
Historical population
Year	Pop.	±% p.a.
1968	2,163	—
1975	3,477	+7.02%
1982	6,083	+8.32%
1990	6,405	+0.65%
1999	6,535	+0.22%
2007	7,589	+1.89%
2012	7,955	+0.95%
2017	8,317	+0.89%
2023	9,019	+1.36%
Source: INSEE

== See also ==
- Communes of the Vaucluse department

== Twinning ==
Morières-lès-Avignon is twinneed with Caldicot, Wales.
