= Canton of Bédarrides =

Coordinates: 44°01′46″N 4°53′25″E

Bédarrides
- Former canton
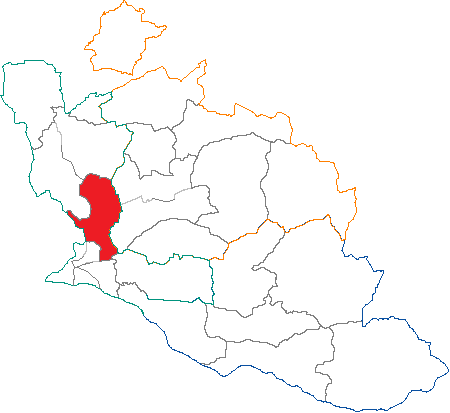
- Country: France
- Region: Provence-Alpes-Côte d'Azur
- Department: Vaucluse
- No. of communes: {{{nbcomm}}}
- Disbanded: 2015
- Area: 100.99 km^{2} (38.99 sq mi)
- Population (2012): 39,677
  - Density: 392.88/km^{2} (1,017.6/sq mi)

The canton of Bédarrides is a French former administrative division in the department of Vaucluse and region Provence-Alpes-Côte d'Azur. It had 39,677 inhabitants (2012). It was disbanded following the French canton reorganisation which came into effect in March 2015.

== Composition ==
The communes in the canton of Bédarrides:

- Bédarrides
- Courthézon
- Sorgues
- Vedène
