= Canton of Orange-Ouest =

Coordinates: 44°07′10″N 4°47′25″E

Orange-Ouest
- Former canton
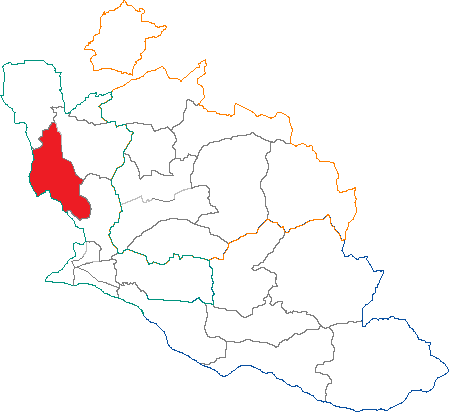
- Country: France
- Region: Provence-Alpes-Côte d'Azur
- Department: Vaucluse
- No. of communes: {{{nbcomm}}}
- Disbanded: 2015
- Area: 129.02 km^{2} (49.81 sq mi)
- Population (2012): 24,579
  - Density: 190.51/km^{2} (493.41/sq mi)

The canton of Orange-Ouest is a French former administrative division in the department of Vaucluse and region Provence-Alpes-Côte d'Azur. It had 24,579 inhabitants (2012). It was disbanded following the French canton reorganisation which came into effect in March 2015.

== Composition ==
The communes in the canton of Orange-Ouest:

- Caderousse
- Châteauneuf-du-Pape
- Orange (partly)
- Piolenc
