= Canton of Carpentras-Sud =

Coordinates: 44°01′54″N 5°00′44″E

Carpentras-Sud
- Former canton
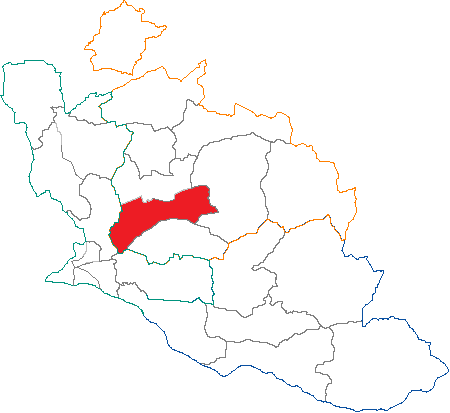
- Country: France
- Region: Provence-Alpes-Côte d'Azur
- Department: Vaucluse
- No. of communes: {{{nbcomm}}}
- Disbanded: 2015
- Area: 118.71 km^{2} (45.83 sq mi)
- Population (2012): 41,948
  - Density: 353.37/km^{2} (915.21/sq mi)

The canton of Carpentras-Sud is a French former administrative division in the department of Vaucluse and region Provence-Alpes-Côte d'Azur. It had 41,948 inhabitants (2012). It was disbanded following the French canton reorganisation which came into effect in March 2015.

== Composition ==
The communes in the canton of Carpentras-Sud:

- Althen-des-Paluds
- Carpentras (partly)
- Entraigues-sur-la-Sorgue
- Mazan
- Monteux
