= Hervé de Lépinau =

French lawyer, author and politician

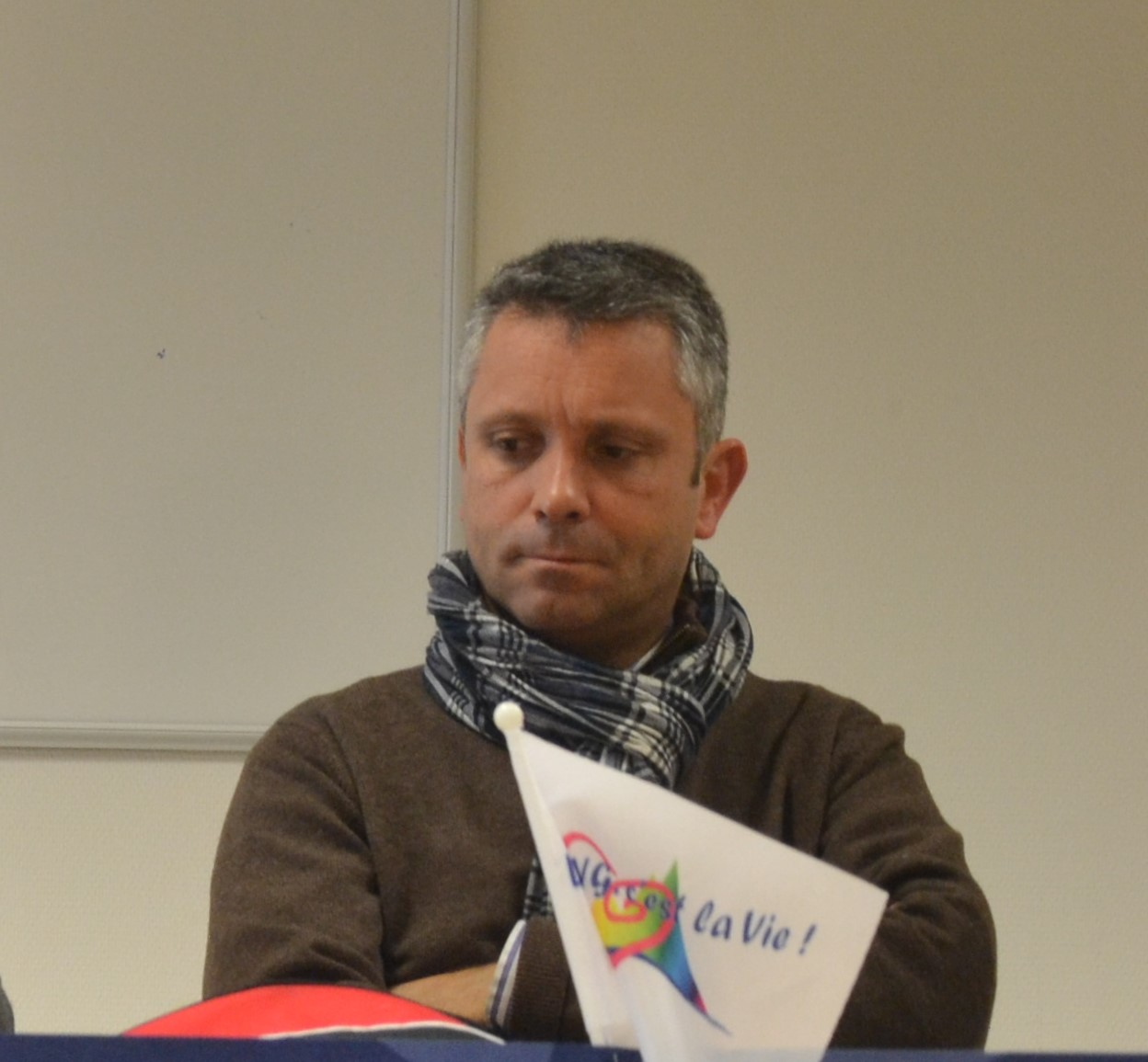

Member of the National Assembly for Vaucluse's 3rd constituency
- Incumbent
- Assumed office 2022
- Preceded by: Adrien Morenas

Personal details
- Born: 8 June 1969 (age 56) Carpentras, France
- Party: National Rally
- Profession: Lawyer, politician

Herve Bruno Marie de Lepinau (born 8 June 1969) is a French lawyer, author and politician of the National Rally who has served as a member of the National Assembly from 2022 representing Vaucluse's 3rd constituency.

== Biography ==
De Lépiau trained as a lawyer and is a member of the Bar of Carpentras. He was affiliated to the General Alliance against Racism and for Respect for French and Christian Identity (AGRIF) for a period. An article in Le Monde described his religious and political beliefs as Catholic and liberal conservative.

In the 2017 French legislative election he was selected to stand in Vaucluse's 3rd constituency after National Front representative Marion Maréchal stood down, but was defeated by Brune Poirson in the final round. During the 2022 French legislative election, he contested the seat again and defeated Poirson's replacement Adrien Morenas.
