= Communauté d'agglomération du Grand Avignon =

Coordinates: 43.95°N 4.81°E

Grand Avignon
- Communauté d'agglomération
- Brown: Gard departement. Red: Vaucluse department.
- Country: France
- Region: Occitanie, Provence-Alpes-Côte d'Azur
- Department: Gard, Vaucluse
- No. of communes: {{{nbcomm}}}
- Established: 2000

Government
  - President: Joël Guin (DVD)
- Area: 302.6 km^{2} (116.8 sq mi)
- Population (2022): 197,102
  - Density: 651.4/km^{2} (1,687/sq mi)
- Website: www.grandavignon.fr

Grand Avignon (full name Communauté d'agglomération du Grand Avignon; Occitan: Communautat d'aglomeracion del Gran Avinhon) is the communauté d'agglomération, an intercommunal structure, comprising the urban agglomeration centred on and around the city of Avignon. It is located in the Vaucluse and the Gard departments, in the Provence-Alpes-Côte d'Azur and Occitanie regions, southern France. It was created in December 2000. Its area is 302.6 km^{2}. Its population was 197,102 in 2022, of which 91,729 in Avignon proper.

== Composition ==
The urban area consists of the following 16 communes (of which 7 in the Gard department):

Communes of Grand Avignon. Red:Vaucluse. Brown: Gard

1. Les Angles, Gard
2. Avignon, Vaucluse
3. Caumont-sur-Durance, Vaucluse
4. Entraigues-sur-la-Sorgue, Vaucluse
5. Jonquerettes, Vaucluse
6. Morières-lès-Avignon, Vaucluse
7. Le Pontet, Vaucluse
8. Pujaut, Gard
9. Rochefort-du-Gard, Gard
10. Roquemaure, Gard
11. Saint-Saturnin-lès-Avignon, Vaucluse
12. Sauveterre, Gard
13. Saze, Gard
14. Vedène, Vaucluse
15. Velleron, Vaucluse
16. Villeneuve-lès-Avignon, Gard
