= Vedène =

Vedène Vedena (Occitan)
- Commune
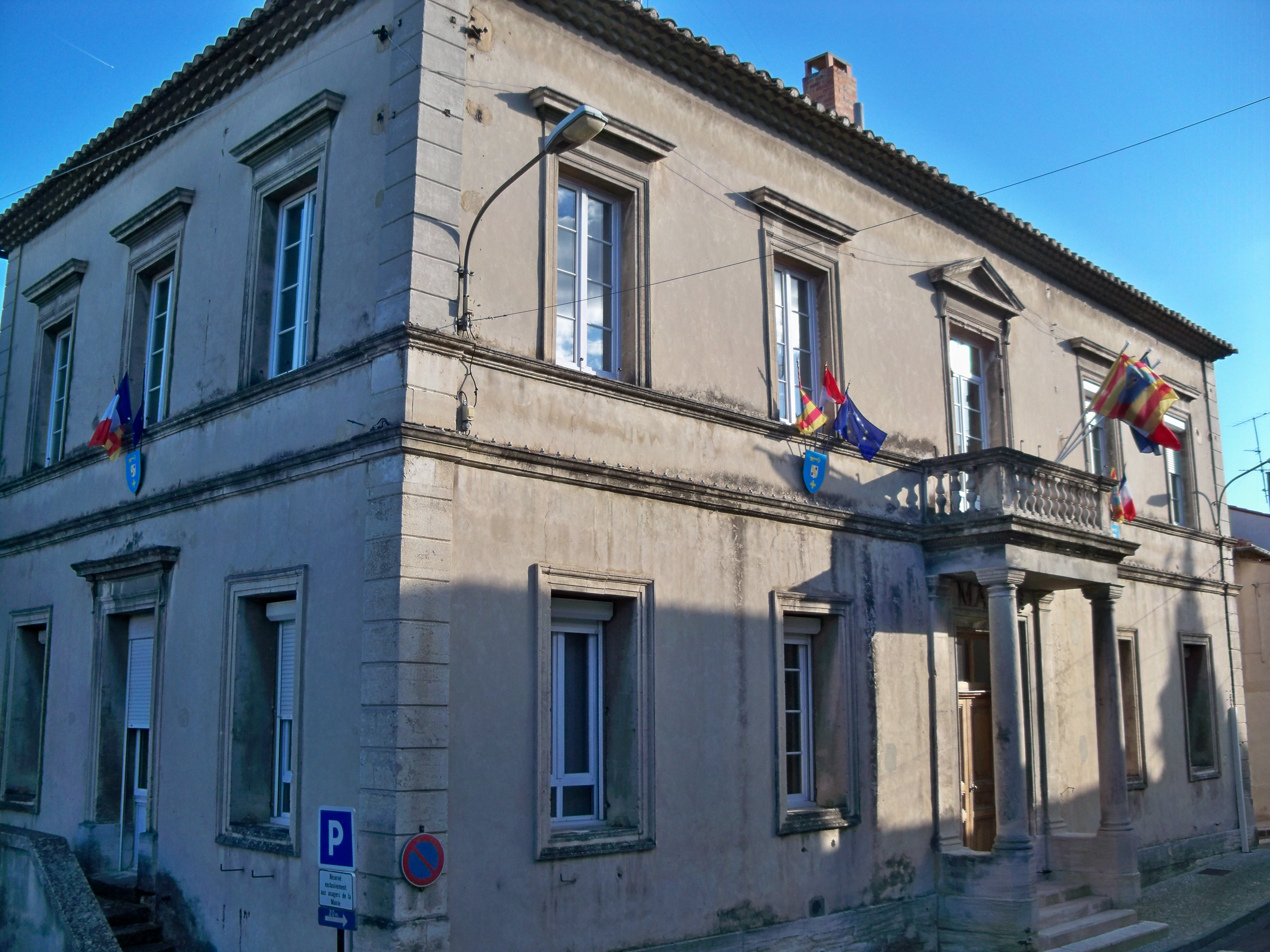
- Town hall

- Coat of arms
- Location of Vedène
- Location within France Location within Provence-Alpes-Côte d'Azur
- Coordinates: 43°58′42″N 4°54′14″E
- Country: France
- Region: Provence-Alpes-Côte d'Azur
- Department: Vaucluse
- Arrondissement: Avignon
- Canton: Le Pontet
- Intercommunality: CA Grand Avignon

Government
  - Mayor (2020–2026): Joël Guin
- Area^{1}: 11.18 km^{2} (4.32 sq mi)
- Elevation: 60 m (200 ft)
- Highest elevation: 117 m (384 ft)
- Lowest elevation: 23 m (75 ft)
- Population (2023): 11,974
  - Density: 1,071/km^{2} (2,774/sq mi)
- Demonym: Vedènais
- Time zone: UTC+01:00 (CET)
  - Summer (DST): UTC+02:00 (CEST)
- INSEE/Postal code: 84141 /84270
- Website: www.mairie-vedene.fr
- ^{1} French Land Register data, which excludes lakes, ponds, glaciers > 1 km^{2} (0.386 sq mi or 247 acres) and river estuaries.

Vedène (French pronunciation: [vədɛn]; Occitan: Vedena) is a commune in the Vaucluse department in the Provence-Alpes-Côte d'Azur region in Southeastern France. A northeastern suburb of Avignon, its historical town centre is dominated by the 12th-century Château de Vedène, known locally as the Château des Seigneurs (lit. 'Castle of the Lords').

The commune is crossed by the A7 autoroute. It is home to the Regional 1 football club Athlétic Club Vedène Le Pontet.

== Population ==
Historical population
Year	Pop.	±% p.a.
1968	3,329	—
1975	4,388	+4.02%
1982	5,588	+3.51%
1990	6,675	+2.25%
1999	8,673	+2.95%
2007	9,805	+1.55%
2012	10,640	+1.65%
2017	11,259	+1.14%
2023	11,974	+1.03%
Source: INSEE

== See also ==
- Communes of the Vaucluse department
