= Velleron =

- Commune
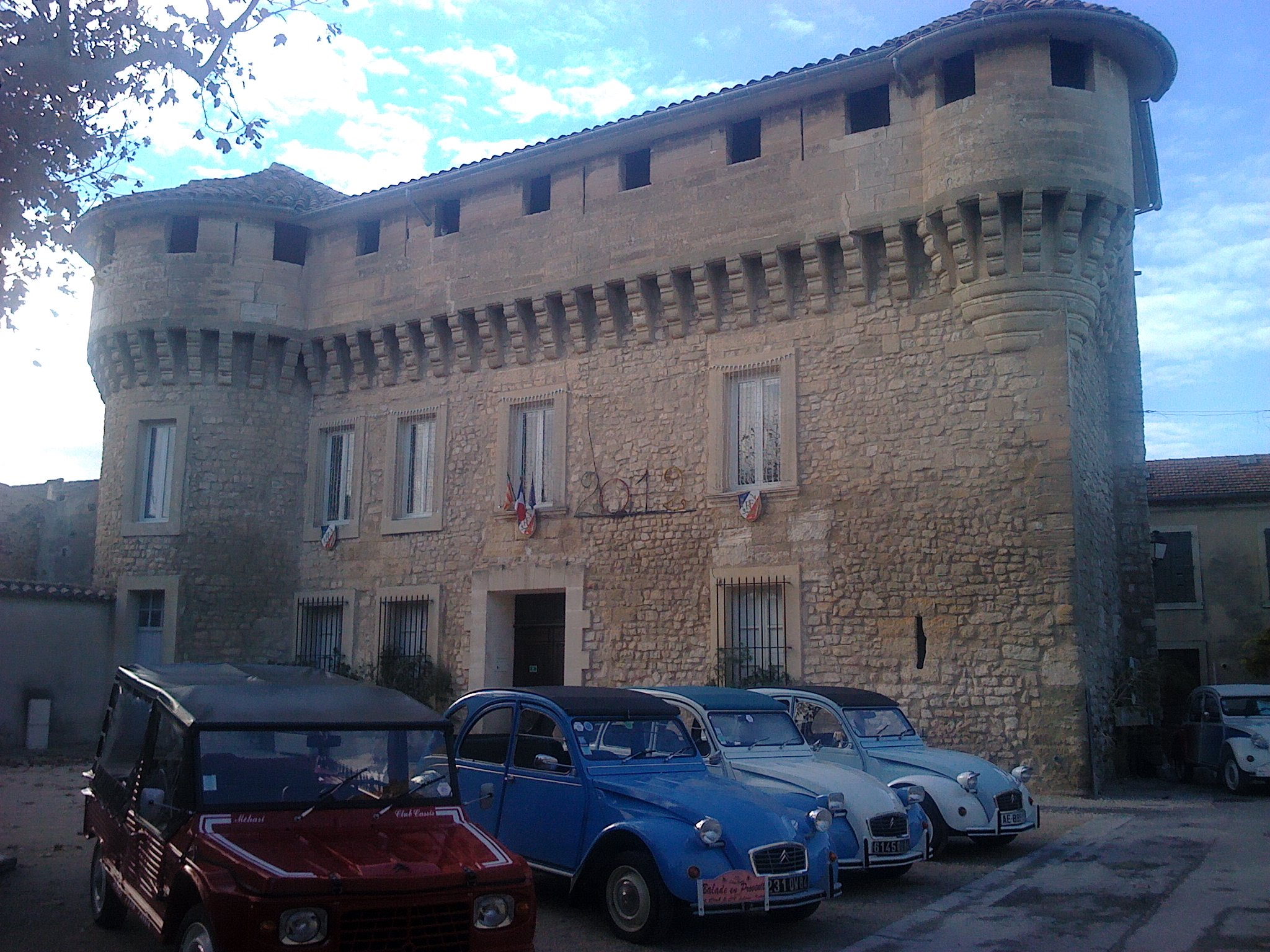
- Velleron's castle

- Coat of arms
- Location of Velleron
- Location within France Location within Provence-Alpes-Côte d'Azur
- Coordinates: 43°57′30″N 5°01′49″E
- Country: France
- Region: Provence-Alpes-Côte d'Azur
- Department: Vaucluse
- Arrondissement: Avignon
- Canton: Le Pontet
- Intercommunality: CA Grand Avignon

Government
  - Mayor (2020–2026): Philippe Armengol
- Area^{1}: 16.39 km^{2} (6.33 sq mi)
- Elevation: 263 m (863 ft)
- Highest elevation: 246 m (807 ft)
- Lowest elevation: 40 m (130 ft)
- Population (2023): 3,168
  - Density: 193.3/km^{2} (500.6/sq mi)
- Time zone: UTC+01:00 (CET)
  - Summer (DST): UTC+02:00 (CEST)
- INSEE/Postal code: 84142 /84740
- ^{1} French Land Register data, which excludes lakes, ponds, glaciers > 1 km^{2} (0.386 sq mi or 247 acres) and river estuaries.

Velleron (French pronunciation: [vɛlʁɔ̃]; Occitan: Veleron) is a commune in the Vaucluse department in the Provence-Alpes-Côte d'Azur region in southeastern France and is one of the constituent communes of the Greater Avignon agglommeration.

== Population ==
Historical population
Year	Pop.	±% p.a.
1968	1,134	—
1975	1,402	+3.08%
1982	2,054	+5.61%
1990	2,509	+2.53%
1999	2,829	+1.34%
2007	3,040	+0.90%
2012	2,927	−0.75%
2017	2,960	+0.22%
2023	3,168	+1.14%
Source: INSEE

== See also ==
- Communes of the Vaucluse department
