= Althen-des-Paluds =

- Commune
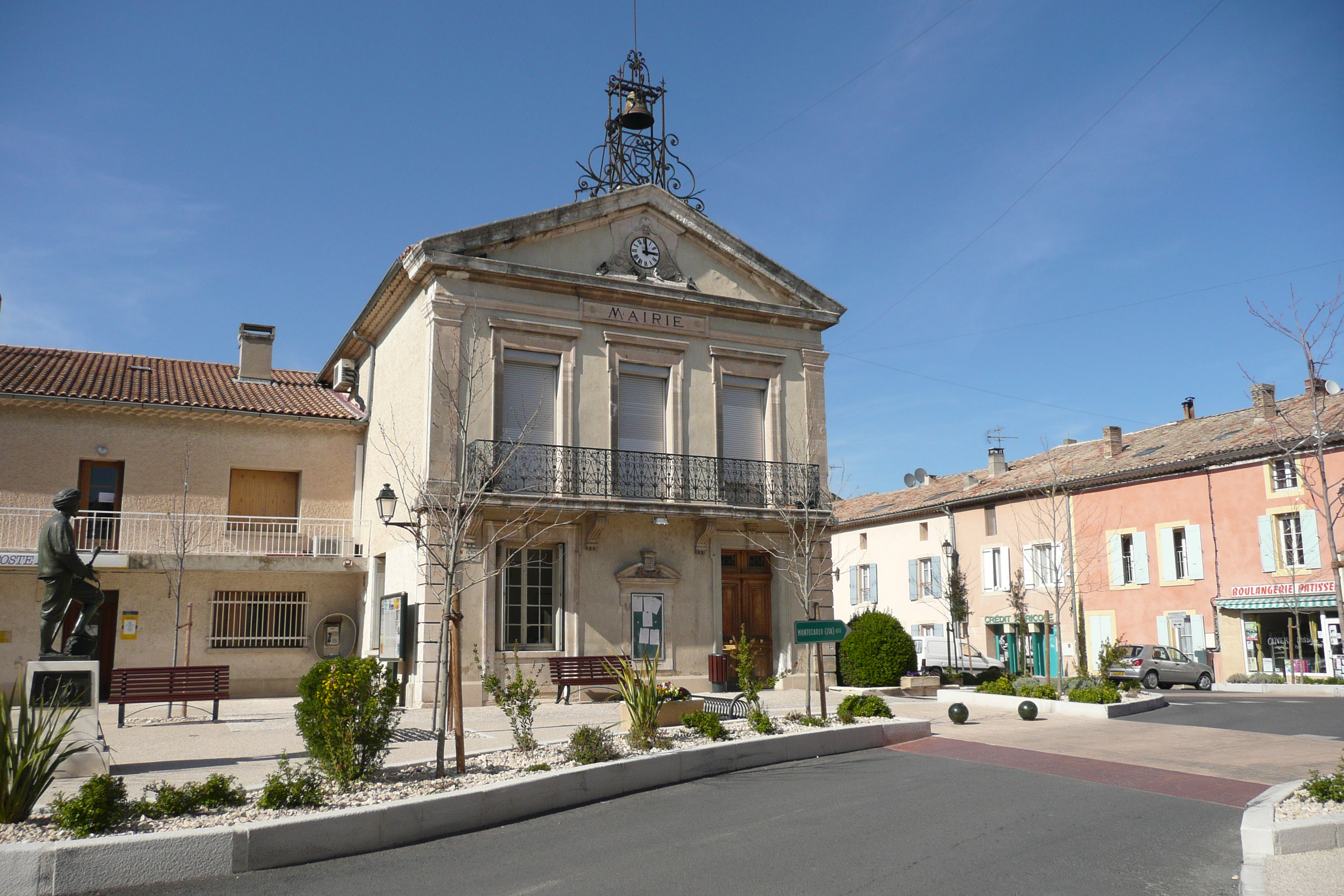
- The town hall of Althen-des-Paluds

- Coat of arms
- Location of Althen-des-Paluds
- Location within France Location within Provence-Alpes-Côte d'Azur
- Coordinates: 44°00′20″N 4°57′32″E
- Country: France
- Region: Provence-Alpes-Côte d'Azur
- Department: Vaucluse
- Arrondissement: Carpentras
- Canton: Monteux
- Intercommunality: CA Sorgues du Comtat

Government
  - Mayor (2020–2026): Michel Terrisse
- Area^{1}: 6.4 km^{2} (2.5 sq mi)
- Elevation: 32 m (105 ft)
- Highest elevation: 38 m (125 ft)
- Lowest elevation: 27 m (89 ft)
- Population (2023): 2,960
  - Density: 460/km^{2} (1,200/sq mi)
- Time zone: UTC+01:00 (CET)
  - Summer (DST): UTC+02:00 (CEST)
- INSEE/Postal code: 84001 /84210
- ^{1} French Land Register data, which excludes lakes, ponds, glaciers > 1 km^{2} (0.386 sq mi or 247 acres) and river estuaries.

Althen-des-Paluds (French pronunciation: [altɛ̃ de paly]; Provençal: Lei Palús or Alten) is a commune in the Vaucluse department in the Provence-Alpes-Côte d'Azur region in southeastern France.

The commune is crossed by the river Sorgue.

== Geography ==
=== Access ===
The town is located halfway between Avignon, the prefecture of the department, and Carpentras, one of the two sub-prefectures along with Apt. The town is connected to both cities by departmental road D942.

Departmental roads D16 and D32 also cross the town.

Although a railway line runs through the town, Althen-des-Paluds is no longer served by the SNCF (French National Railway Company). The old station was not reopened when the Sorgues-Châteauneuf-du-Pape to Carpentras line was re-opened. The nearest train stops are in Monteux and Entraigues-sur-la-Sorgue.

=== Topography ===
Althen-des-Paluds is spread over a relatively flat plain of 625 hectares, with a maximum elevation difference of 11 meters.

=== Hydrography ===
The Sorgue de Velleron passes through the commune, as does the Gaffins canal which draws its water from it.

=== Neighboring communes ===
The neighbouring communes are Bédarrides, Entraigues-sur-la-Sorgue, Monteux and Pernes-les-Fontaines.

=== Seismicity ===
The cantons of Bonnieux, Apt, Cadenet, Cavaillon, and Pertuis are classified as Zone Ib (low risk). All other cantons in the Vaucluse department are classified as Zone Ia (very low risk). This zoning corresponds to seismic activity that only exceptionally results in the destruction of buildings.

=== Climate ===
In 2010, the town's climate was classified as a true Mediterranean climate, according to a study by the French National Centre for Scientific Research (CNRS) based on data covering the period 1971-2000. In 2020, Météo-France published a typology of the climates of metropolitan France, in which the town is classified as having a Mediterranean climate and is located in the Provence-Languedoc-Roussillon climate region, characterized by low rainfall in summer, abundant sunshine (2,600 hours/year), hot summers (21.5°C), very dry air in summer and dry conditions year-round, strong winds (40-50% of winds exceeding 5 m/s), and little fog.

For the period 1971-2000, the average annual temperature was 14.3°C, with an annual temperature range of 18°C. The average annual rainfall is 672 mm, with 5.8 days of precipitation in January and 2.7 days in July. For the period 1991-2020, the average annual temperature observed at the nearest Météo-France weather station, "Carpentras," located in the municipality of Carpentras 9 km away as the crow flies, is 14.7 °C, and the average annual rainfall is 665.5 mm. The maximum temperature recorded at this station is 44.3 °C, reached on June 28, 2019; the minimum temperature is -15.4 °C, reached on January 7, 1985.

The commune's climate parameters were estimated for the middle of the century (2041-2070) according to different greenhouse gas emission scenarios based on the new DRIAS-2020 reference climate projections. They can be viewed on a dedicated website published by Météo-France in November 2022.

== Urban planning ==
=== Typology ===
As of January 1, 2024, Althen-des-Paluds is categorized as an urban belt, according to the new seven-level municipal density grid defined by INSEE in 2022. It belongs to the Avignon urban area, an inter-regional agglomeration encompassing 59 communes, of which it is a suburban commune. Furthermore, the commune is part of the Avignon catchment area, of which it is a peripheral commune. This area, which includes 48 communes, is categorized as having a population between 200,000 and 700,000.

=== Land use ===
Land cover in the commune, as shown in the European biophysical land cover database Corine Land Cover (CLC), is characterized by a significant amount of agricultural land (80.2% in 2018), a decrease compared to 1990 (85.7%). The detailed breakdown in 2018 is as follows: heterogeneous agricultural areas (80.2%), urbanized areas (18.5%), and forests (1.2%). Changes in land cover and infrastructure within the commune can be observed on various maps of the territory: the Cassini map (18th century), the General Staff map (1820-1866), and IGN maps and aerial photographs for the current period (1950 to the present).

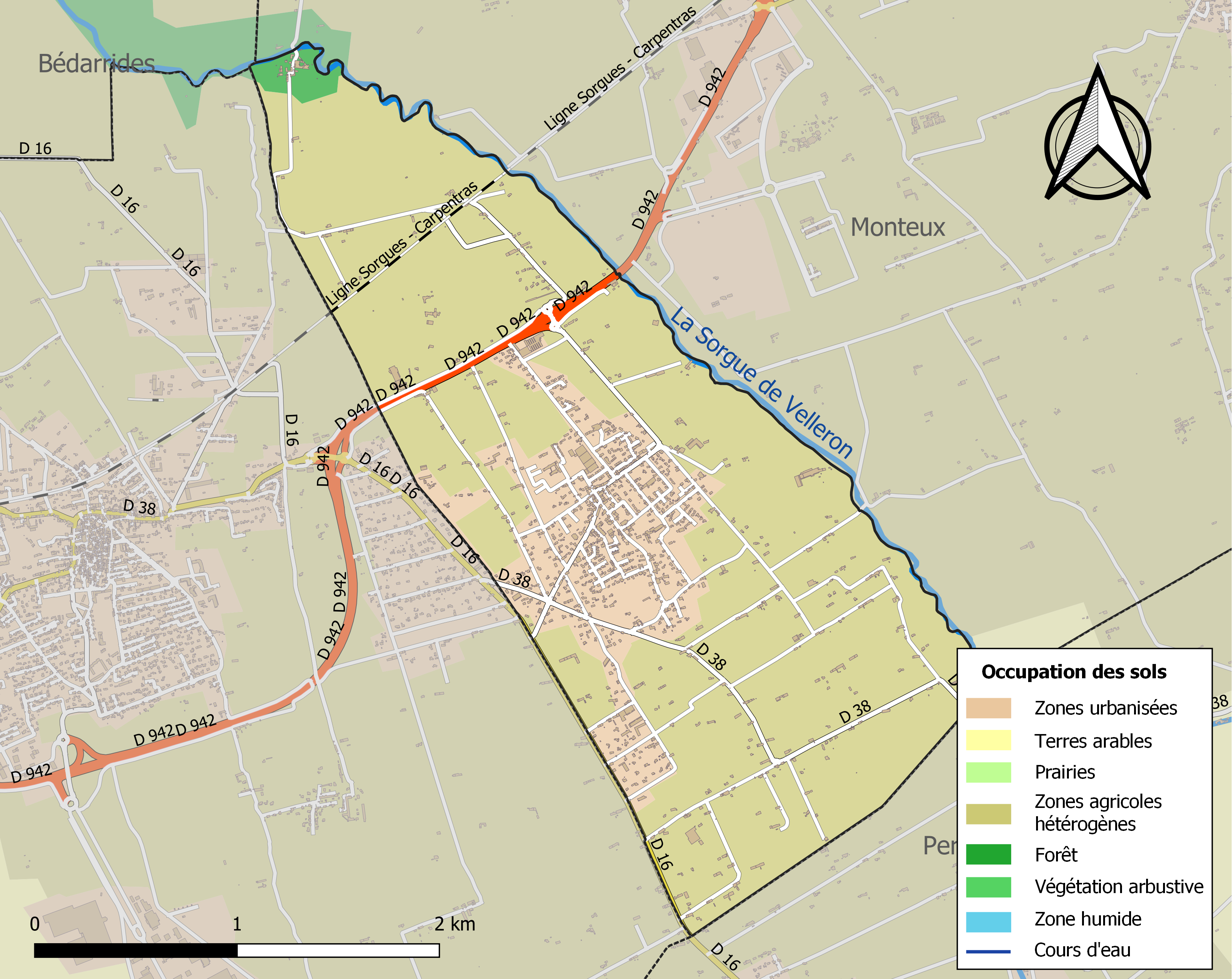
Map of infrastructure and land use of Althen-des-Paluds

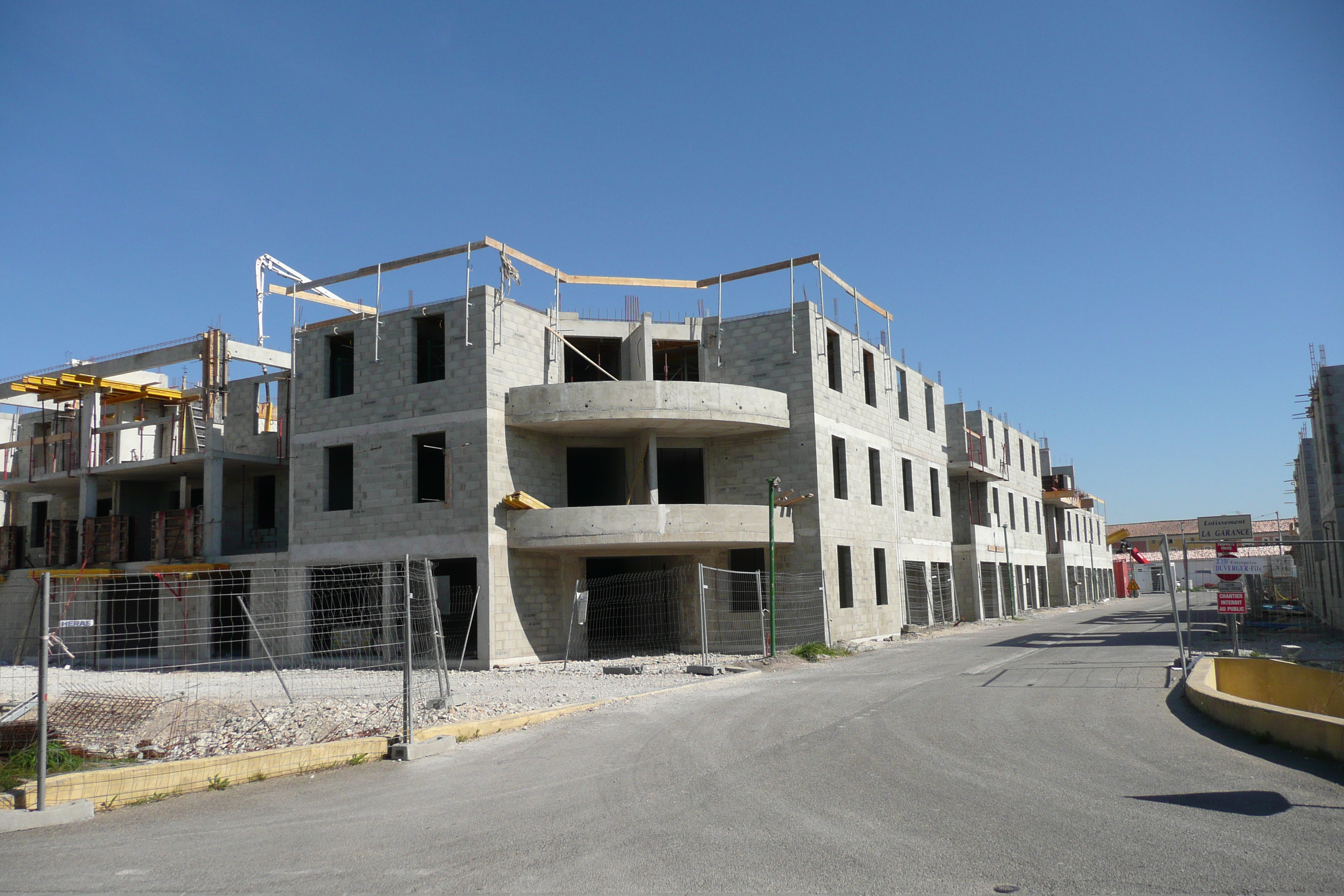
Urbanization of the commune.

=== Environment ===
Household waste and similar waste are collected and processed by the Les Sorgues du Comtat inter-municipal authority and the inter-municipal joint association for the study, construction, and operation of household waste treatment facilities in the Cavaillon region (SIECEUTOM).

The commune's commitment to sustainable development (photovoltaic panels at the school, GMO-free zone) earned it the Marianne d'Or award for sustainable development in 2010.

== Population ==
Historical population
Year	Pop.	±% p.a.
1968	1,173	—
1975	1,288	+1.35%
1982	1,575	+2.92%
1990	1,600	+0.20%
1999	1,988	+2.44%
2007	2,431	+2.55%
2012	2,684	+2.00%
2017	2,823	+1.01%
2023	2,960	+0.79%
Source: INSEE

== Name ==
The name Althen-des-Paluds is a tribute to Jean Althen, an Armenian enslaved in Turkey, who was later rescued and came to Avignon in 1756 to conduct his first experiments in cultivating madder.

The term "Paluds," derived from palun, refers to marshes or swamps. The town once had many marshes, due to the presence of the Sorgue River.

== Society and services ==
=== Education ===
The town has a nursery school and a primary school. Afterwards, students are directed to the Lou Vignarès middle school in Vedène, then to the Jean-Henri-Fabre high school or the Victor-Hugo high school in Carpentras.

=== Sports ===
Several sports are practiced in clubs, including karate, football, judo, cycling (the proximity of Mont Ventoux attracts cyclists), and tennis. Fishing is possible thanks to the Sorgue river.

=== Health ===
Several professions are represented in the town: four doctors practice together in a medical center; two nursing practices, as well as one independent nurse, offer their services (seven professionals in total); three physiotherapists, a dentist, and a pharmacy complete the healthcare services. The nearest hospitals are located in Carpentras and Avignon.

=== Public transport ===
Several bus lines serve Althen-des-Paluds:

- 5.1 Carpentras - Avignon;
- 13.2 Les Valayans (hamlet of Pernes-les-Fontaines) - Sorgues, via Entraigues-sur-la-Sorgue.

The nearest motorway is the A7, Avignon-Nord exit. The nearest TGV station is Avignon TGV station.

=== Cults ===
The parish of Althen-des-Paluds, of Catholic worship, depends on the diocese of Avignon, deanery of Carpentras.

=== Local life ===
Althen, which is organized around two main streets, has a bakery, a tobacco store, two restaurants, a pizzeria and a grocery store. The town also holds some yearly events and markets, like veteran car meet, wine festival and a christmas market.

== History ==
=== Prehistory and antiquity ===
During this period, this territory consisted of nothing but inhospitable and uninhabitable marshland. Its drainage began under Roman rule with the construction of the first dikes in an attempt to channel the Sorgue River.

=== Middle Ages ===
Attempts to contain the flooding continued throughout the medieval period. This territory then belonged to the lords of Monteux and the Montmajour Abbey. As early as 1211, William III, Bishop of Carpentras, having reached an agreement with the co-lords Isnard d'Entrevennes, Imbert, and Raymond d'Agoult, obtained exemption from all tolls on their fief. At that time, the fief was under the jurisdiction of the Count of Toulouse. It was in 1240 that Raymond VII granted its suzerainty to Barral des Baux, his nephew by marriage, while it was held in joint tenancy by eight lords.

=== Renaissance ===
This entire period was marked by plague epidemics, the most significant of which affected the population in 1588-89 and then in 1630, culminating in the Great Plague of 1721.

=== Modern period ===
Having been reclaimed throughout the Middle Ages and the Renaissance, the land was finally able to accommodate the first large farms. The castle chapel of Beauchamp, served by the Observant Friars, became the first place of worship, and then the consuls of Monteux obtained permission from the Abbot of Montmajou, the tithe-collecting prior, to have a new church built at his own expense in 1780.

On August 12, 1793, the department of Vaucluse was created, comprising the districts of Avignon and Carpentras, as well as those of Apt and Orange, which belonged to the Bouches-du-Rhône department, and the canton of Sault, which belonged to the Basses-Alpes department.

In the 1830s, the village prospered thanks to madder, which allowed it to acquire its autonomy from Monteux by royal decree of June 4, 1845. It then took the name of Althen-des-Paluds.

=== Contemporary period ===
In 1846, Avignon erected a statue of Jean Althen. It remained in the city until 1936, when Louis Gros (then mayor of Avignon) gifted it to Mr. Perrin, the mayor of Althen-des-Paluds. It was then installed in the village's main square. In 1943, as part of the Vichy regime's policy of recovering non-ferrous metals, the monument was dismantled and melted down to contribute to the Nazi war effort to manufacture weapons.

== Economy ==
=== Local shops ===
The town has small shops such as a tobacconist/newsagent, a bakery, a pharmacy and a mini-market.

=== Industry ===
Historically, the plain, after being drained of its marshes, was used for madder cultivation. In 1754, Jean Althen began cultivation trials in Saint-Chamond, then renewed them from 1763 onwards with greater success in the Comtat Venaissin, with the support of the Marquis de Caumont, First Consul of Avignon. However, there was no significant growth due to imports from the Levant. But the wars of the French Revolution hampered trade, and farmers took up this crop, which developed to reach its peak around 1860.

In 1839, there were fifty madder mills in Vaucluse, whereas there were only ten mills on the Sorgue River in 1804. In some years, Vaucluse produced up to almost 65% of the world's madder. From 1860 onwards, several major crises (over-farming, lower quality, etc.) affected this crop, which was increasingly challenged by recent advances in chemistry. By 1880, only one of the fifty mills remained.

The four mills in Althen-des-Paluds were converted into madder mills at the beginning of the 19th century, then into ochre mills at the end of the 19th century. Following these two industries, numerous other crops developed, including gladiolus cultivation.

=== Tourism ===
Located in the Comtat Venaissin plain, near Avignon and its rich heritage, Carpentras and Mont Ventoux, and with the Sorgue river flowing through it, the town sees tourism play a significant role in its economy, both directly and indirectly. The town has two hotels, etc.

=== Agriculture ===
The commune's territory is a plain watered by the Sorgue River, which is relatively well-suited to agriculture. From the late 19th century onward, the construction of the Avignon-Carpentras railway line accelerated the commune's agricultural focus. From the 1960s:

- Fruit orchards;
- Early produce;
- Horticulture.

== Culture and sights ==
- Church of the Assumption in Althen-des-Paluds.
- The oldest part of town is Saint-Albergaty.
- Bell tower (above the town hall)
- Gaffins Mill
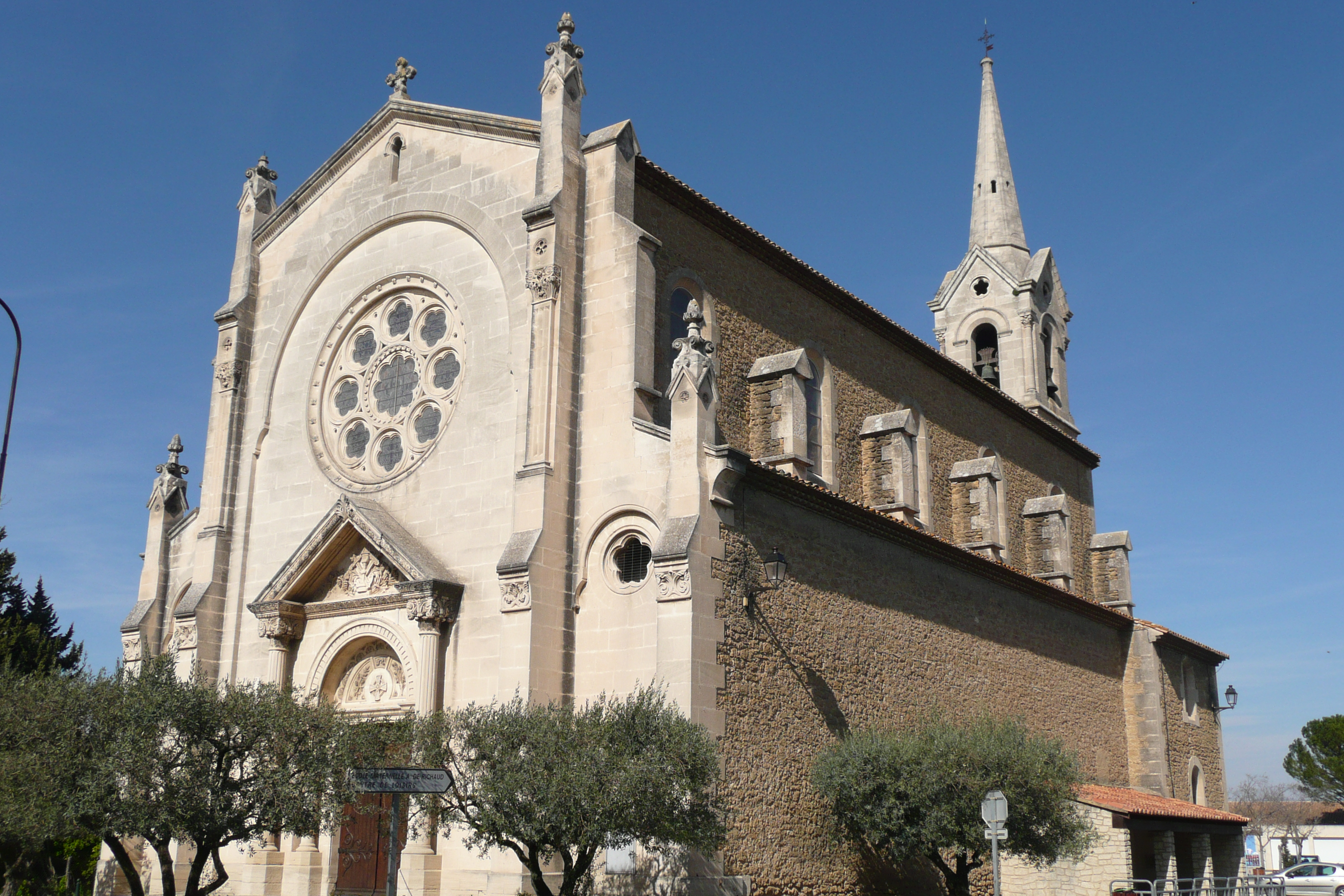
Church of Althen.

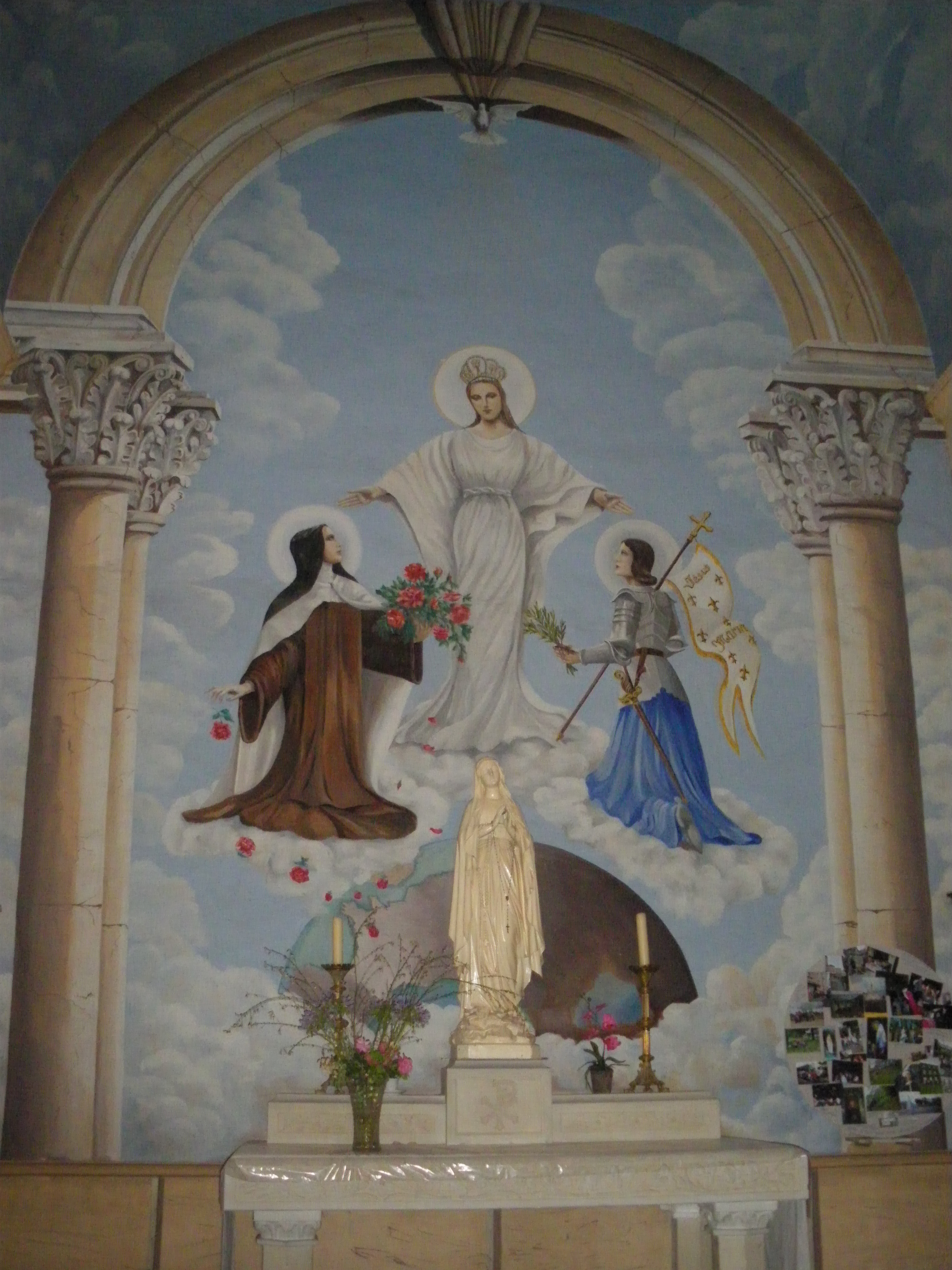
Interior of the church. Painting depicting the Virgin Mary with Saint Thérèse of Lisieux and Saint Joan of Arc at her sides.

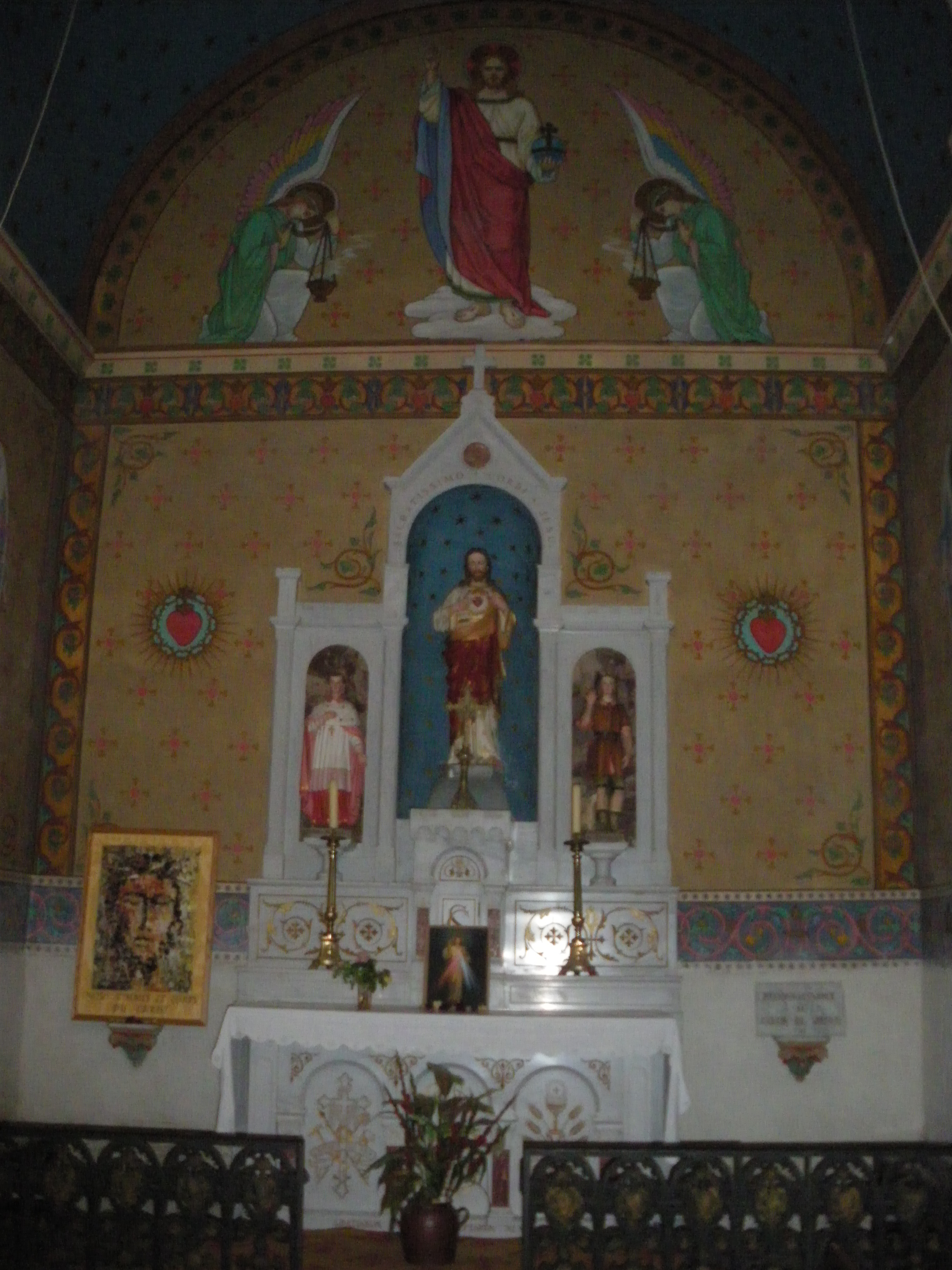
Interior of the church. Chapel of the Sacred Heart of Jesus

=== Heraldry ===
Arms of Althen-des-Paluds	Gules, a scarlet spade or, flanked by two madder flowers of the same, a base wavy argent and azure. This coat of arms dates from 1980. The wavy base represents the Sorgue river.

== International relations ==
Althen-des-Paluds is twinned with Monte Carlo, Monaco.

== Gallery ==
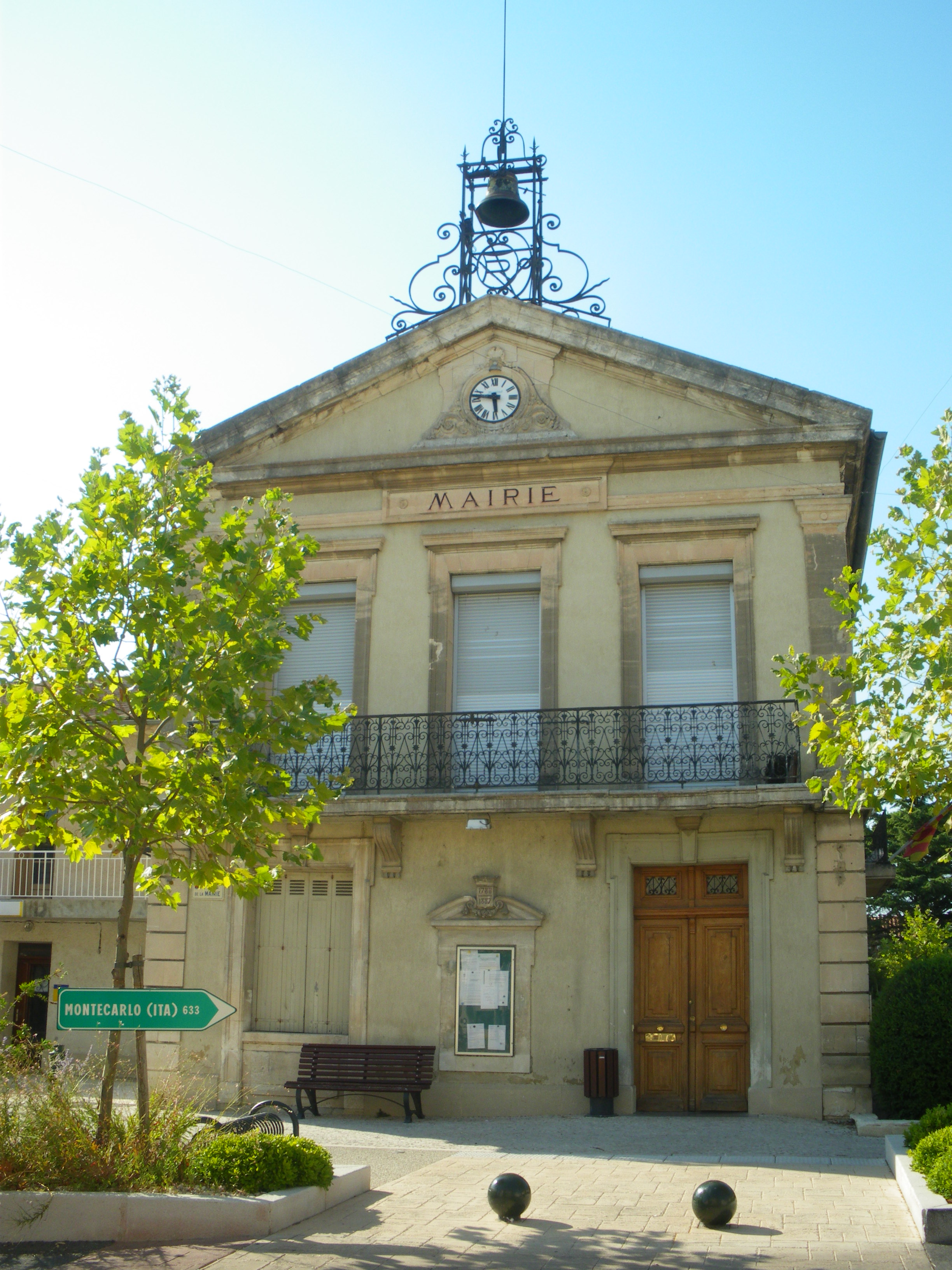
Town hall of Althen des Paluds

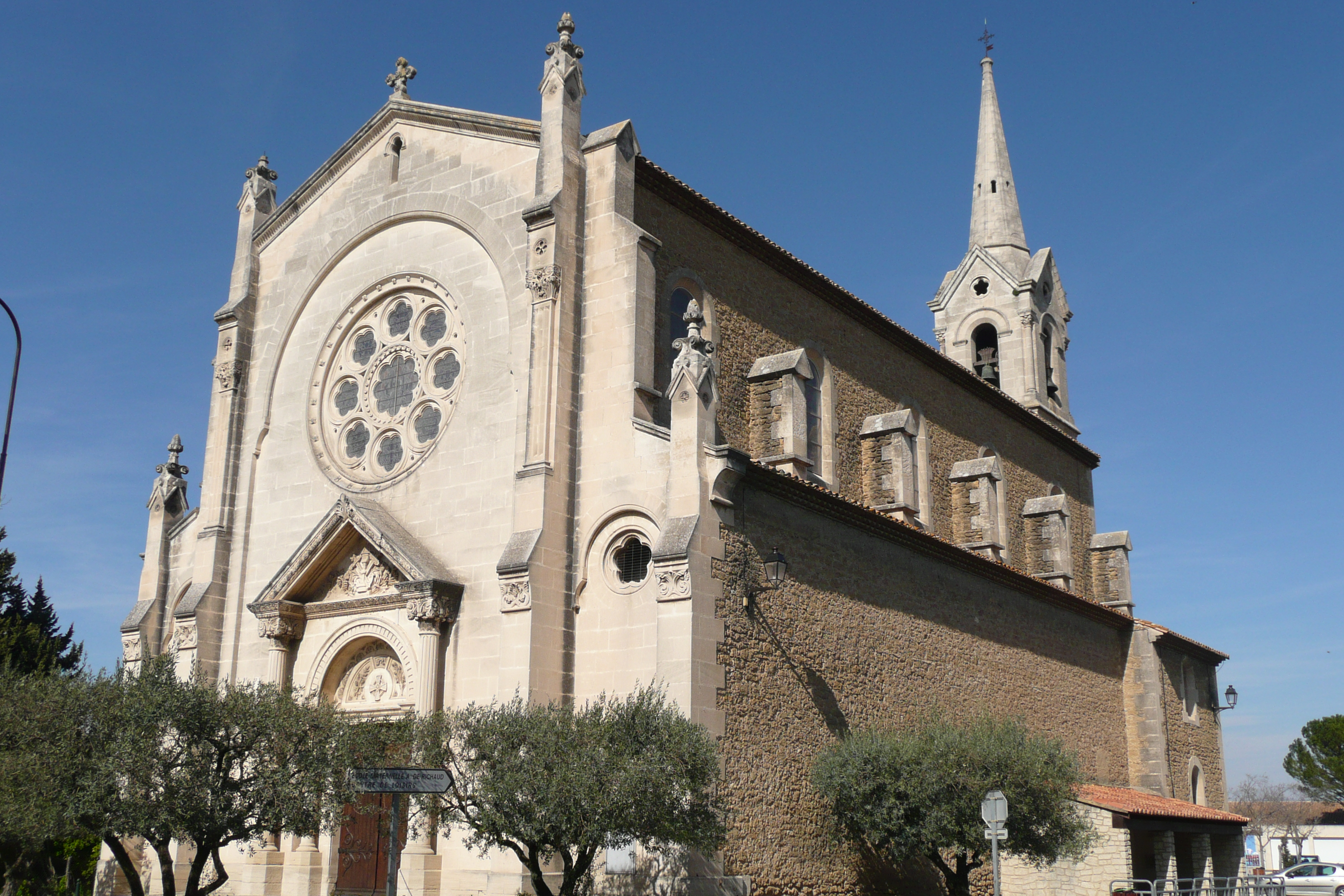
Church of Althen des Paluds

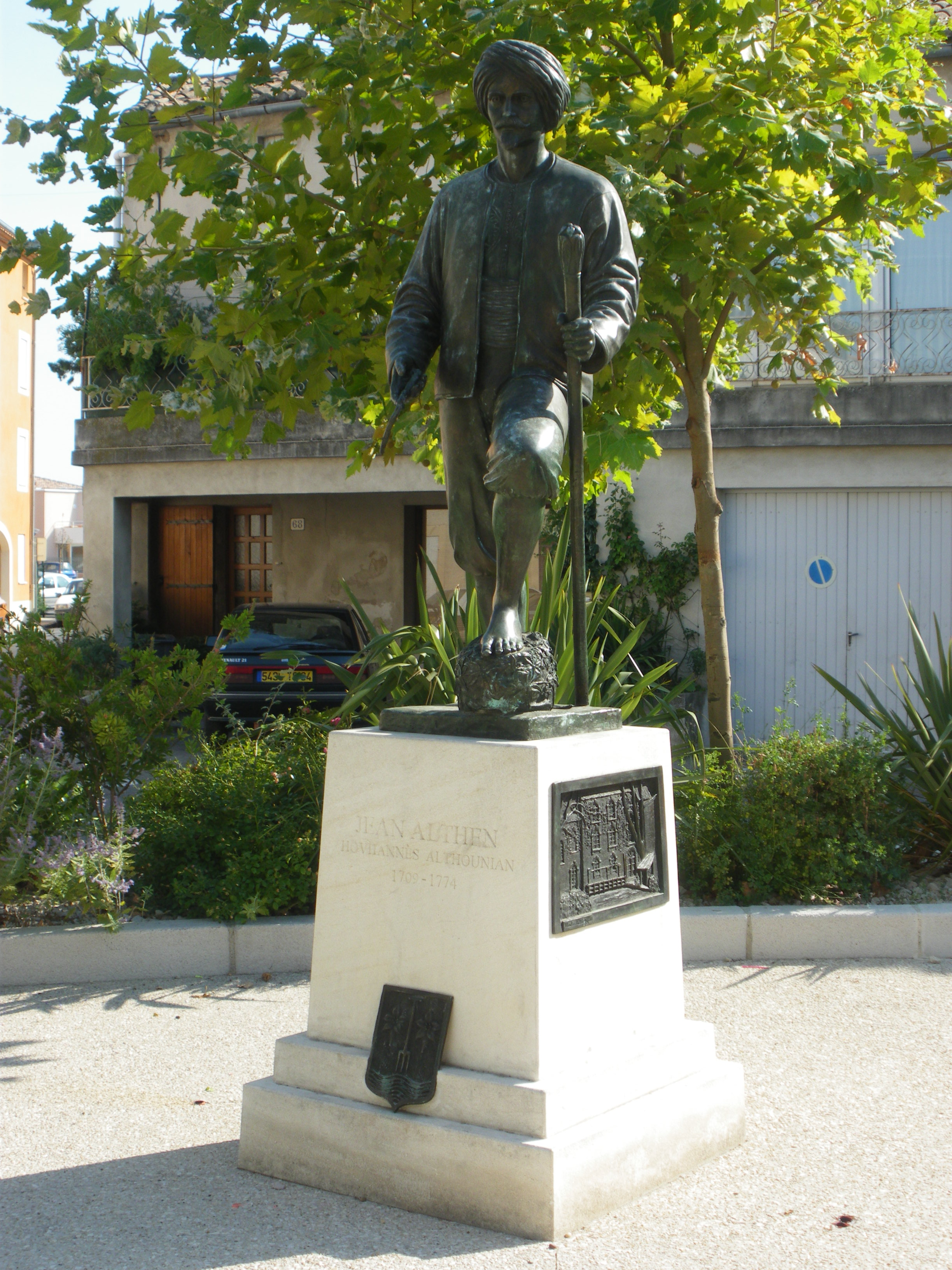
Jean Althen Statue

== See also ==
- Communes of the Vaucluse department
