= Monteux (disambiguation) =

Monteux is a commune in the Vaucluse department, France.

Monteux may also refer to:

== Places ==
- Canton of Monteux, administrative division of the Vaucluse department, France
- Beaumont-Monteux, commune in the Drôme department, France

== People ==
- Claude Monteux (1920–2013), American flutist and conductor
- Gerard Monteux (born 1955), known as Bill Patrick, American sports commentator
- Henri Monteux (1874–1943), French actor
- Pierre Monteux (1875–1964), French conductor
