= Monteux =

- Commune
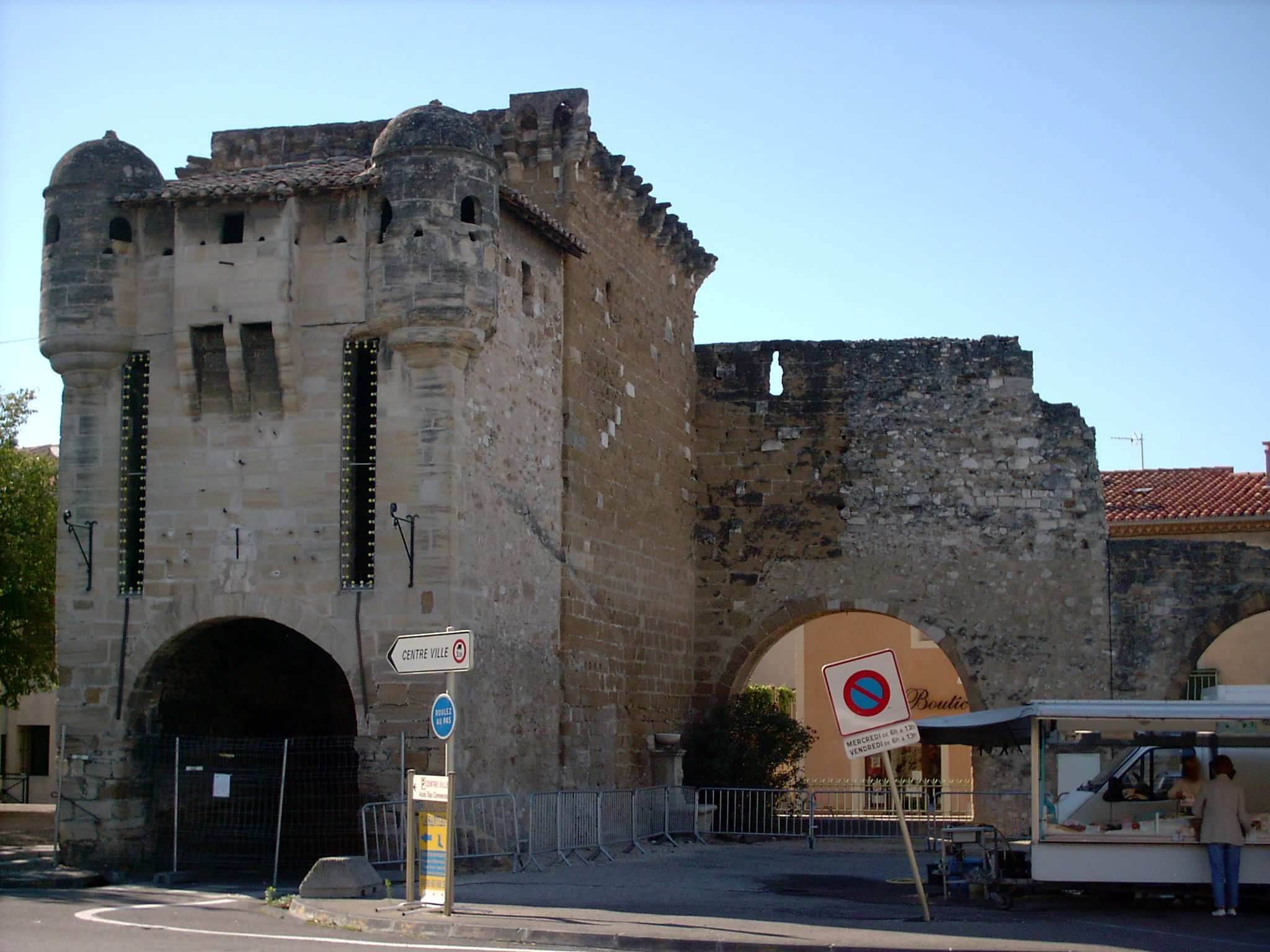
- Old city gate

- Coat of arms
- Location of Monteux
- Location within France Location within Provence-Alpes-Côte d'Azur
- Coordinates: 44°02′10″N 4°59′49″E
- Country: France
- Region: Provence-Alpes-Côte d'Azur
- Department: Vaucluse
- Arrondissement: Carpentras
- Canton: Monteux
- Intercommunality: CA Sorgues du Comtat

Government
  - Mayor (2020–2026): Christian Gros
- Area^{1}: 39.02 km^{2} (15.07 sq mi)
- Elevation: 42 m (138 ft)
- Highest elevation: 80 m (260 ft)
- Lowest elevation: 26 m (85 ft)
- Population (2023): 13,301
  - Density: 340.9/km^{2} (882.9/sq mi)
- Time zone: UTC+01:00 (CET)
  - Summer (DST): UTC+02:00 (CEST)
- INSEE/Postal code: 84080 /84170
- ^{1} French Land Register data, which excludes lakes, ponds, glaciers > 1 km^{2} (0.386 sq mi or 247 acres) and river estuaries.

Monteux (French pronunciation: [mɔ̃tø]; Occitan: Monteus) is a commune in the Vaucluse department in the Provence-Alpes-Côte d'Azur region in southeastern France.

== Geography ==
Monteux is near Carpentras, in middle of Comtat Venaissin, and around 20 km from Avignon, in the countryside between Mont Ventoux, the Rhône and the Durance. Its inhabitants are called Montelais or Montiliens.

The patron saint of the city is Saint Gens.

=== Nearby towns ===
Althen-des-Paluds, Entraigues-sur-la-Sorgue, Carpentras, Sarrians, Pernes-les-Fontaines, Loriol-du-Comtat.

=== Hydrography ===
The river Auzon crosses the commune to the north of the historical center.

=== Climate ===
The commune, located in the zone of influence of the Mediterranean climate, has four seasons. Two are dry: a short winter and a very long summer; two are rainy: autumn and spring. While the summers generally are hot and dry, due to subtropical anticyclone activity, there are stormy periods, sometimes violent. The winters are gently. Rain is infrequent and snow rare.

Month	Jan	Feb	Mar	Apr	May	Jun	Jul	Aug	Sep	Oct	Nov	Dec	Year
Average maximum temperatures (°C)	10	12	16	18	23	27	30	30	25	20	13	10	19,75
Average minimum temperatures (°C)	2	3	6	8	12	15	18	18	14	11	6	3	9,6
Average temperatures (°C)	6	7,5	11	13	17,5	21	24	24	19,5	15,5	8,5	7,5	14,7
Average monthly precipitation (mm)	36,5	23,3	24,9	47,5	45,6	25,4	20,9	29,1	65,8	59,6	52,8	34,0	465,4
Source : Données climatologiques de Carpentras 2000-2007

== History ==
=== Antiquity ===
On the site of Bellegarde was exhumed a burial with incineration, remains of basalmaires, a terra cotta lamp, a plate and a glazed bowl of red ground.

=== Middle Ages ===
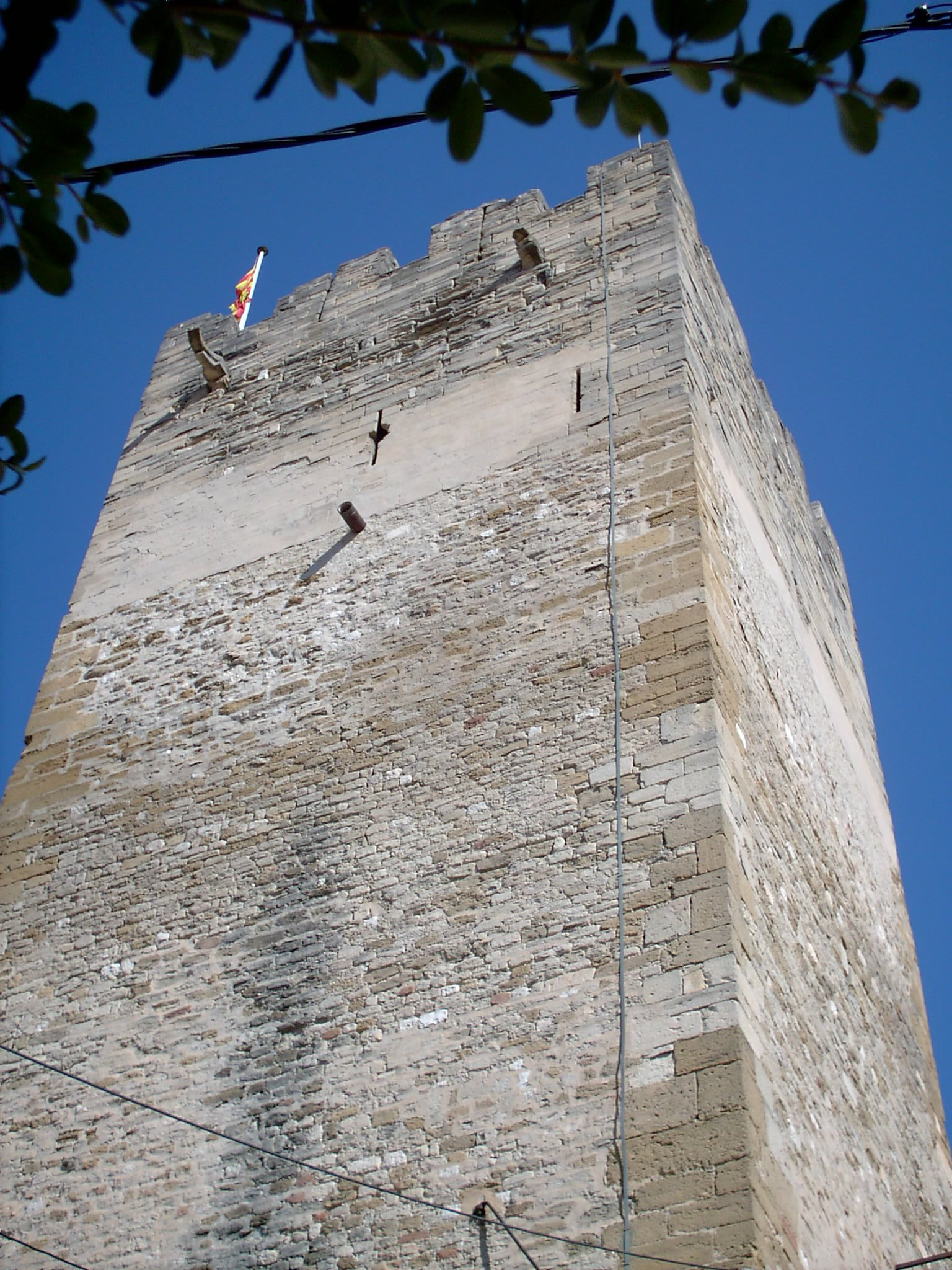
The Tower Clementine in which resided the Pope Clement V

As of 1211, Guillaume III, bishop of Carpentras, which compromised with the Co-lords Isnard d' Entrevennes, Imbert and Raymond d' Agoult, obtained the exemption of straight of toll on their stronghold. This one depended then on the count de Toulouse. It was in 1240 that Raymond VII gave of it suzerainty to Barral of the Beams, his nephew by alliance, then qu' he was in paréage between eight lords.

=== Today ===
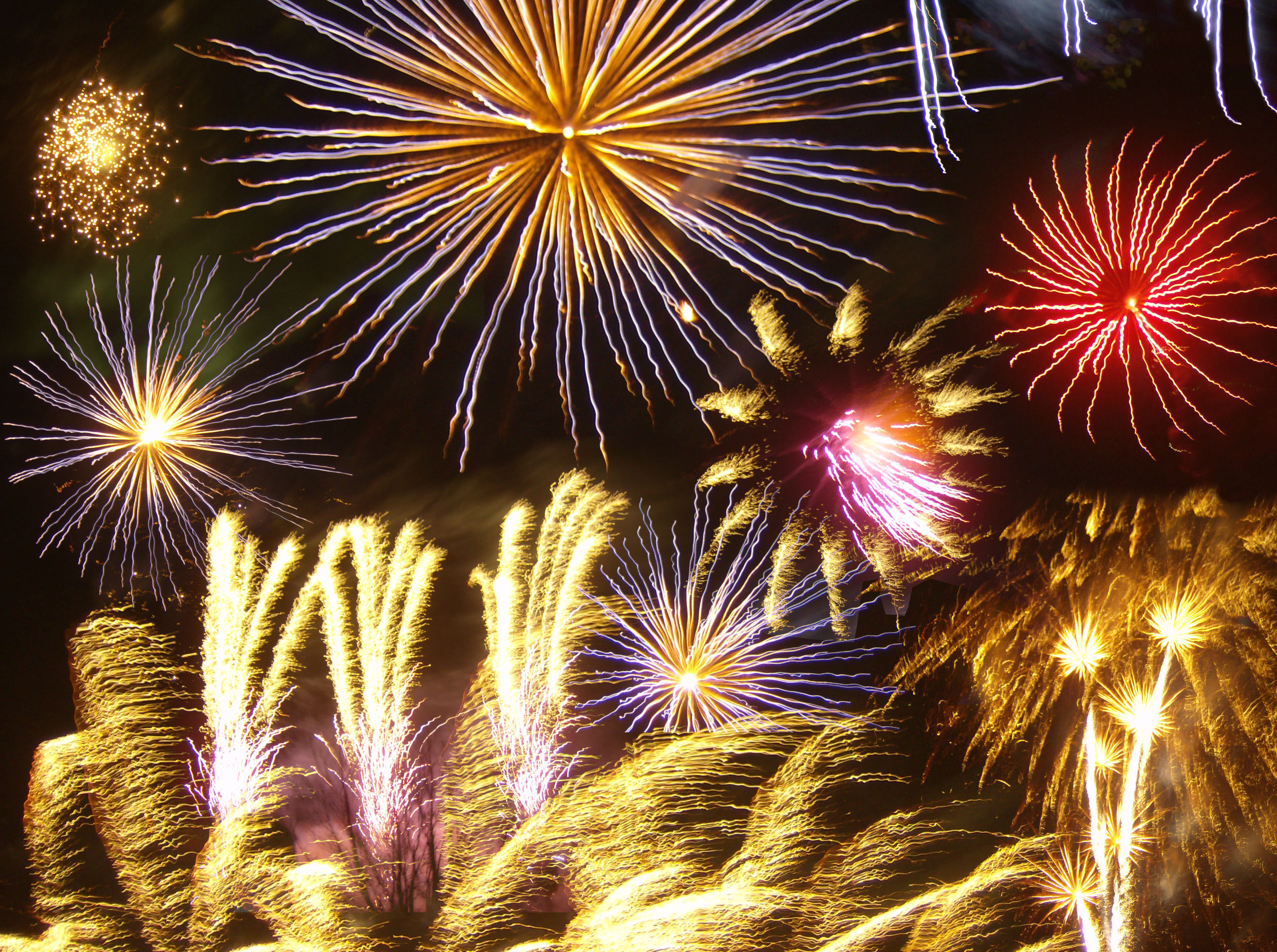
Fireworks

Irrigation of the plain of Comtat Venaissin by channel of Carpentras and the installation of the railroad, with the line Avignon/Carpentras made it possible Monteux to develop an intensive agricultural activity related to the truck farming and fruit-bearing arboriculture. An industrial development gross in the area too: Ruggieri bomb disposal expert (pyrotechnical) and Ducros-Vahine (food industry).

=== Toponymy ===
The name of the commune is attested as of the 12th century in the form of ' ' of Montilis' ' (1188) like ' ' Montilium' ' or ' ' Monticulus' '. This C-W communication little will evolve/move since l' ' is found; ' Montels' ' in 1464 and ' ' Monteulx' ' in 1558.

== Administration ==
The Municipal council is composed of 33 members: the Mayor, 9 assistant, and 23 city council men. He meets 8 to 10 times per annum in the Room of the Council of Town hall and rule by deliberations all businesses of the commune.

There exists also a Municipal council of Children, composed of 17 members, elected officials each year by the pupils of cycle 3 of the schools of the commune.

=== Intercommunality ===
Monteux belongs to the Community of communes Sorgues of Comtat, also made up of Althen-des-Paluds, and of Pernes-les-Fontaines.

It was created the 24. The community of common belongs to several mixed trade-unions:

- Syndicat mixte ITER Vaucluse
- Syndicat mixte intercommunautaire pour l'étude, la construction et l'exploitation d'unités de traitement des ordures ménagères de la région de cavaillon (sieceutom)
- Syndicat mixte pour la création et le suivi du schéma de cohérence territoriale (SCOT) du sud Luberon

=== Twin towns ===
Monteux is twinned with Gladenbach in Germany, and Niemcza, in Poland.

== Demography ==
Historical population
Year	Pop.	±% p.a.
1968	5,867	—
1975	6,471	+1.41%
1982	7,524	+2.18%
1990	8,157	+1.01%
1999	9,564	+1.78%
2007	10,728	+1.45%
2012	11,436	+1.29%
2017	12,909	+2.45%
2023	13,301	+0.50%
Source: INSEE

== Economy ==
=== Tourism ===
Each year, in second half of May are held medieval festivals on a different topic. They spread out over 36 hours and mobilize 150 artists. Towards the end August, a gigantic fire is drawn; artifice which attracts a considerable crowd.

=== Agriculture ===
As of the end of the 19th century, the installation of the railway line Avignon/Carpentras accelerated the agricultural vocation of the commune. From years 1960, use of the agricultural greenhouses made it possible to market two speculations: the strawberry of Carpentras and the melon of Cavaillon.

=== Industry ===
Four zones of activities, covering 90 hectares, accommodate the companies: ZAC of Escampades I and II, the Artisanal Zone of Tapy and the Industrial Park of Beauchamp.

The main entreprises are:

- Ducros-Vahiné, La Tisanière, industrie alimentaire
- Louis Martin, conserveries
- Conserveries Charles Faraud
- SIMC materiaux (Societée Industrielle de Materiaux de Construction)
- Transports Lurit
- Ruggieri

== Culture ==
=== Monuments ===
- Tower Clémentine
- Old walls of the city

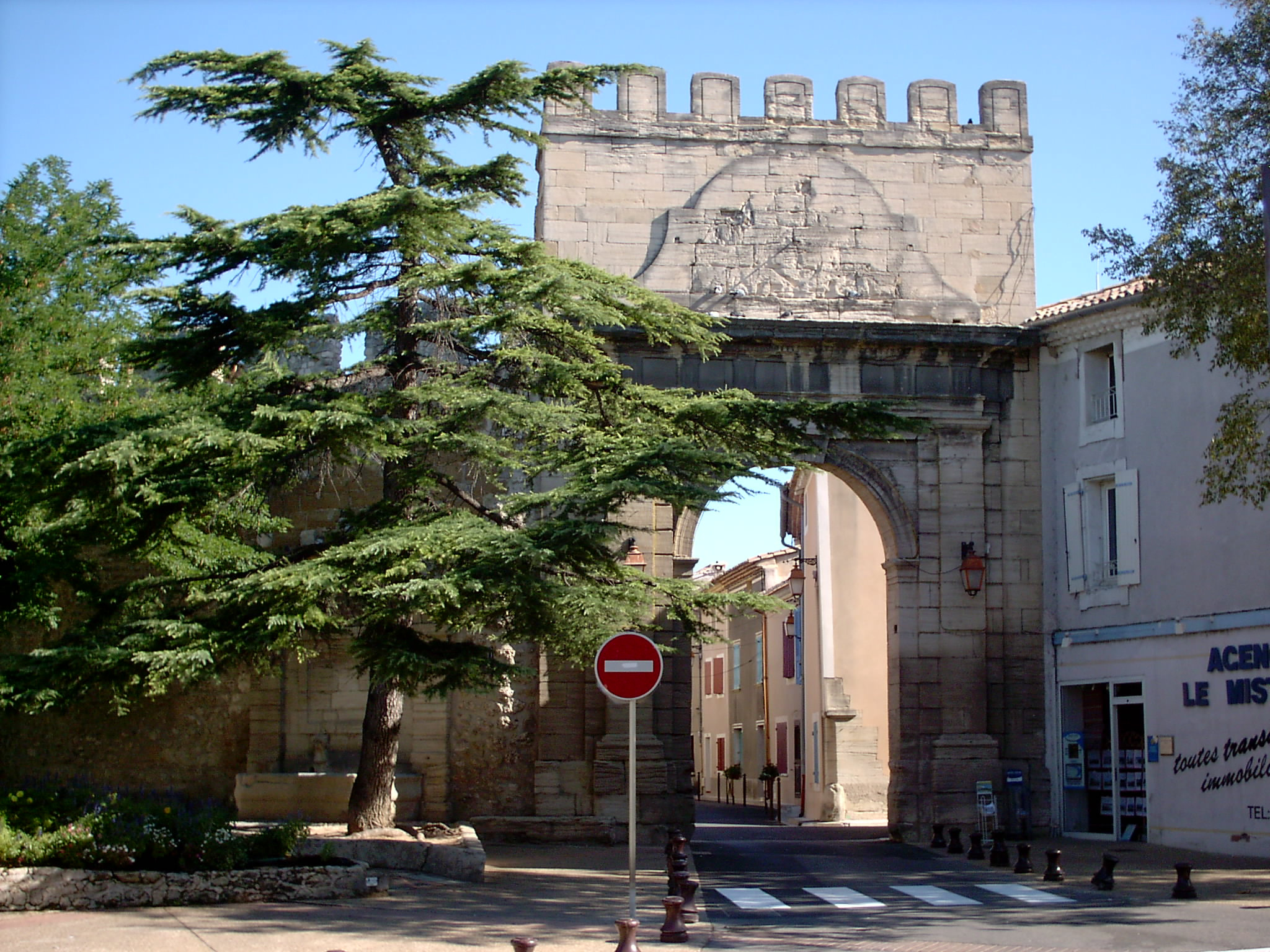
Old Avignon's door

- Church Notre Dame de Nazareth
- Chapel Notre Dame des Grâces
- Chapel des Pénitents Noirs

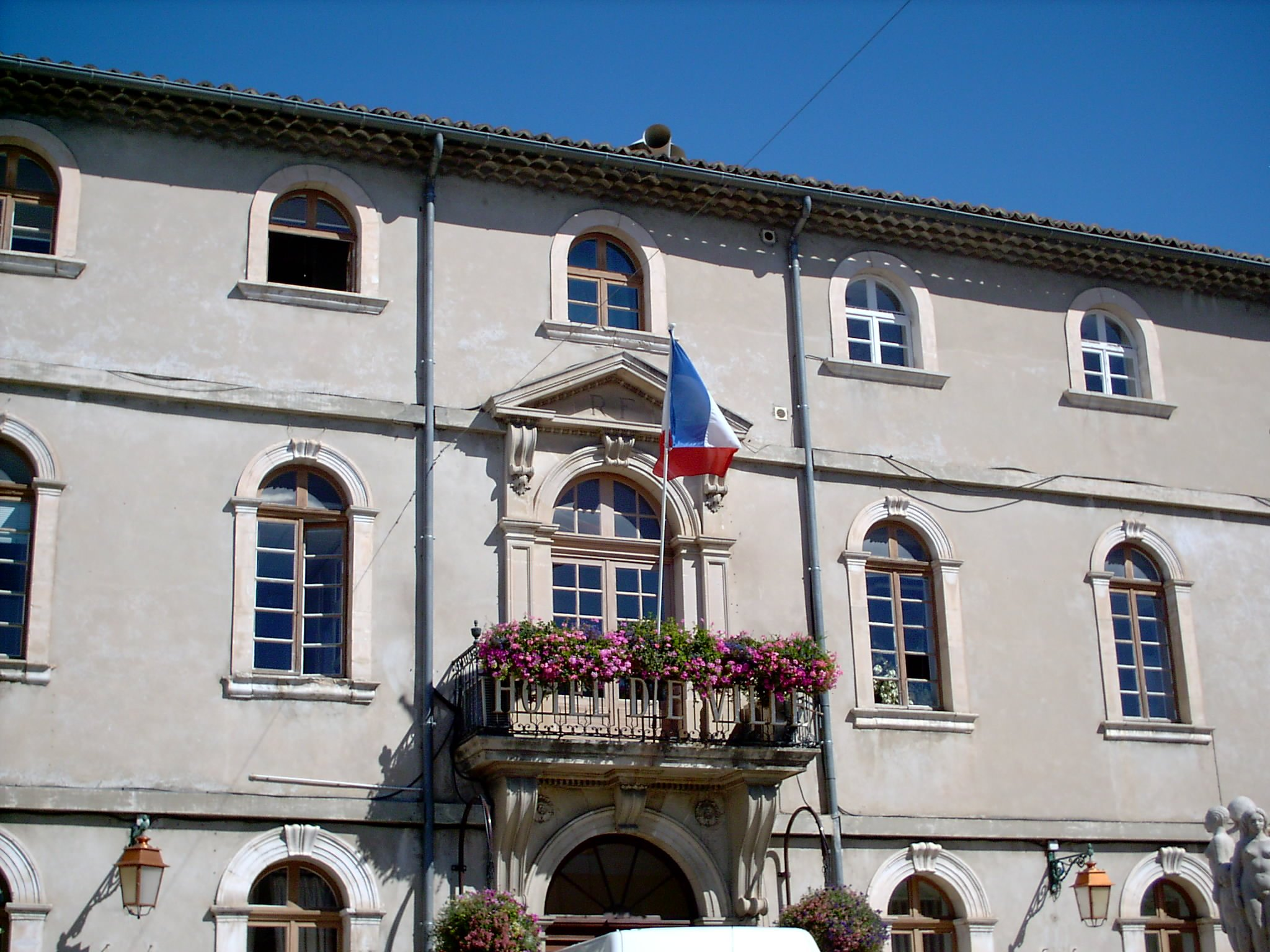
Town hall

- Town hall - this building was a hospital before, Hôpital St Pierre.

=== Sports ===
Many sports associations: rugby, football, handball, moto-ball, tennis, running, ping-pong, pétanque, cycling.

3 stadium : Georges Henri, Bertier et St-Hilaire

== Personalities ==
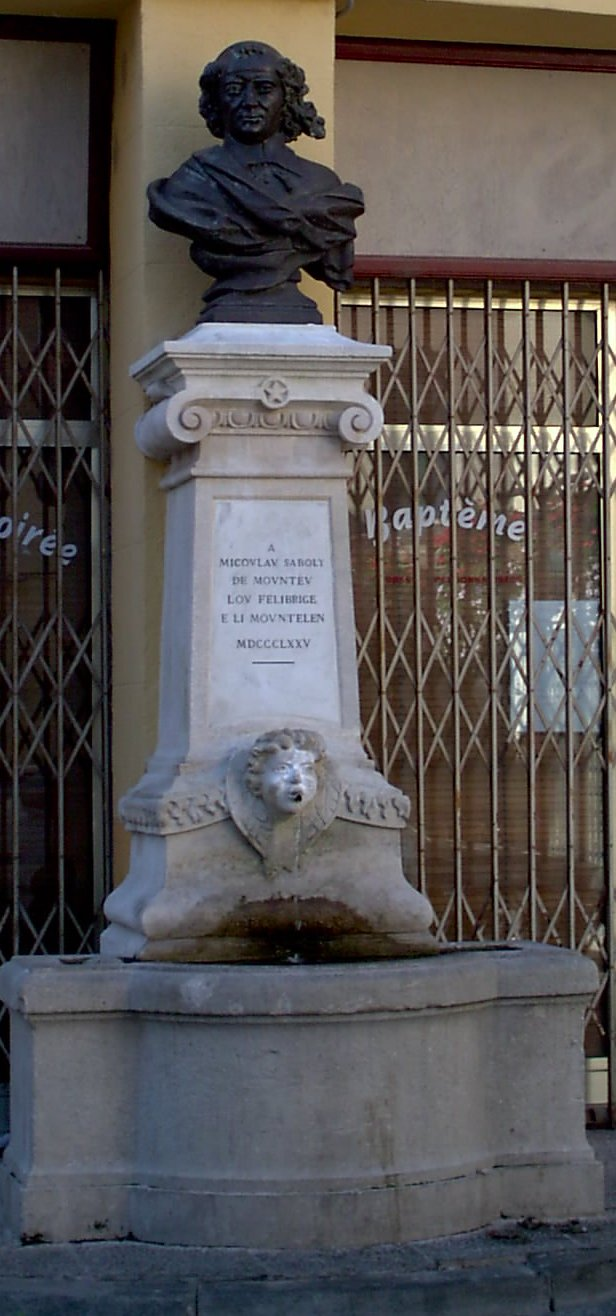
Fountain with a bust of Nicolas Saboly

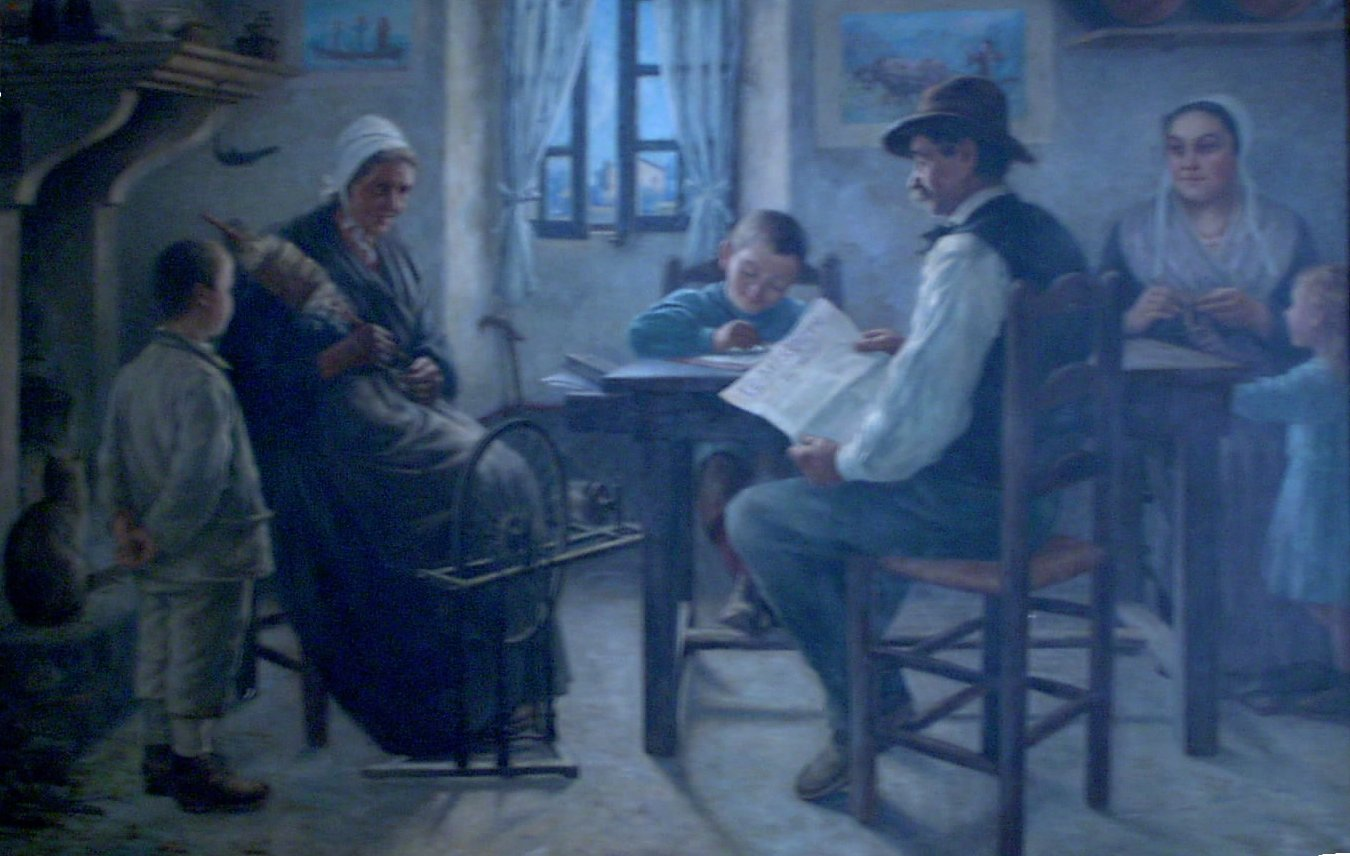
Painting of Benoni Auran

- Nicolas Saboly (1614–1675)
- Félicien Trewey
- Benoit Benoni-Auran
- André Chiron

== See also ==
- Communes of the Vaucluse department

== Bibliography ==
- Jules Courtet, Dictionnaire géographique, géologique, historique, archéologique et biographique du département du Vaucluse, Avignon, 1876.
- Robert Bailly, Dictionnaire des communes du Vaucluse, Éd. A. Barthélemy, Avignon, 1986. ISBN 2-903044-27-9
