= Bring a Torch, Jeanette, Isabella =

17th-century French Christmas carol

Melody of "Bring a Torch, Jeanette, Isabella"

"Bring a Torch, Jeanette, Isabella" ("French: Un flambeau, Jeannette, Isabelle") is a Christmas carol which originated from the Provence region of France in the 17th century.

The carol was first published in France, and was subsequently translated into English in the 18th century.

== History ==
The carol first appeared in print in 1688 with the Provençal text Venès lèu, Vèire la piéucello; Venès lèu, Genti pastourèu! in a collection of twelve Provençal Christmas carols by Nicolas Saboly. The popularity of the melody is attested by its use four years later by Marc-Antoine Charpentier for the drinking song, "Qu'ils sont doux, bouteille jolie" in a 1672 revival of Molière's Le Médecin malgré lui.

To this day on Christmas Eve in Provence, children dress as shepherds and milkmaids, bringing torches and candles while singing the carol on their way to Midnight Mass.

== Lyrics ==
The characters "Jeannette" and "Isabelle/Isabella" are two female farmhands who have found the Baby Jesus and his mother Mary in a stable. Excited by this discovery, they run to a nearby village to tell the inhabitants, who rush to see the new arrivals. Visitors to the stable are urged to keep their voices quiet, so the newborn can enjoy his dreams.

Un flambeau, Jeannette, Isabelle,
Un flambeau, courons au berceau!
C'est Jésus, bonnes gens du hameau,
Le Christ est né; Marie appelle,
Ah! Ah! Ah! Que la Mère est belle,
Ah! Ah! Ah! Que l'Enfant est beau!

Qui vient là, frappant de la sorte?
Qui vient là, en frappant comme ça?
Ouvrez-donc, j'ai posé sur un plat
De bons gâteaux, qu'ici j'apporte
Toc! Toc! Ouvrons-nous la porte!
Toc! Toc! Faisons grand gala!

C'est un tort, quand l'Enfant sommeille,
C'est un tort de crier si fort.
Taisez-vous, l'un et l'autre, d'abord!
Au moindre bruit, Jésus s'éveille.
Chut! chut! Il dort à merveille,
Chut! chut! Voyez comme il dort!

Doucement, dans l'étable close,
Doucement, venez un moment!
Approchez! Que Jésus est charmant!
Comme il est blanc! Comme il est rose!
Do! Do! Que l'Enfant repose!
Do! Do! Qu'il rit en dormant!

Bring a torch, Jeanette, Isabella,
Bring a torch, to the cradle run!
It is Jesus, good folk of the village;
Christ is born and Mary's calling:
Ah! Ah! Beautiful is the Mother!
Ah! Ah! Beautiful is Her Son!

Who is that, knocking on the door?
Who is it, knocking like that?
Open up, we've arranged on a platter
Lovely cakes that we have brought here
Knock! Knock! Open the door for us!
Knock! Knock! Let's celebrate!

It is wrong when the Child is sleeping,
It is wrong to talk so loud!
Silence, all, as you gather around,
Lest your noise should waken Jesus:
Hush! Hush! See how fast He slumbers;
Hush! Hush! See how fast He sleeps!

Softly to the little stable,
Softly for a moment come;
Look and see how charming is Jesus,
How He is white, His cheeks are rosy!
Hush! Hush! See how the Child is sleeping;
Hush! Hush! See how He smiles in dreams!
