= Saint Gens =

French Roman Catholic saint

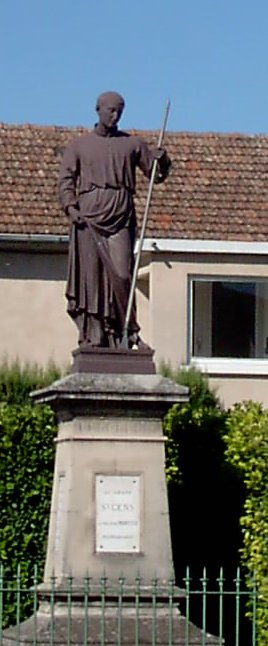
- Statue of Grand saint Gens, in Monteux
- Born: 1104; Monteux
- Died: 16 May 1127

Saint Gens (1104 – 16 May 1127), also named Saint Gens du Beaucet, was a hermit.

== Biography ==
He was born in Monteux, near Carpentras, in today's southern France at the beginning of the 12th century. When he was a teenager, he lived far from his family and his village, as a hermit, in a small valley around Le Beaucet.

He lived in renouncement, praying, working and doing penitence. He is called upon to obtain rain during droughts. With his death, on May 16, 1127, he was buried close to a rock in the middle of the small valley where a Romance vault was high about the middle of the 12th century. Many miracles are attributed to his intervention, and his veneration is approved by the Catholic Church.

== Legends and miracles ==
- Gens settled in the ruins of an old monastery, cultivating a plot of land for his subsistence with the help of the two cows which his father had given him on his departure. He prayed unceasingly for all sinners. One day, he was deeply absorbed by his prayer, a wolf rushed on one of his cows to slaughter it. Gens tamed the wolf, and forced it to plow with the cow which remained.
- His mother sought him to bring back him to Monteux. She asked him for a little water, because she was thirsty. At once, a source ran on her hand.
- Arriving at Monteux, Gens asked the priests of the place to organize a procession to obtain the end of the drought. The procession had not yet traversed the streets of the village when the rain started to fall.
