= Benoit Benoni-Auran =

Provençal master painter

Benoît Benoni-Auran
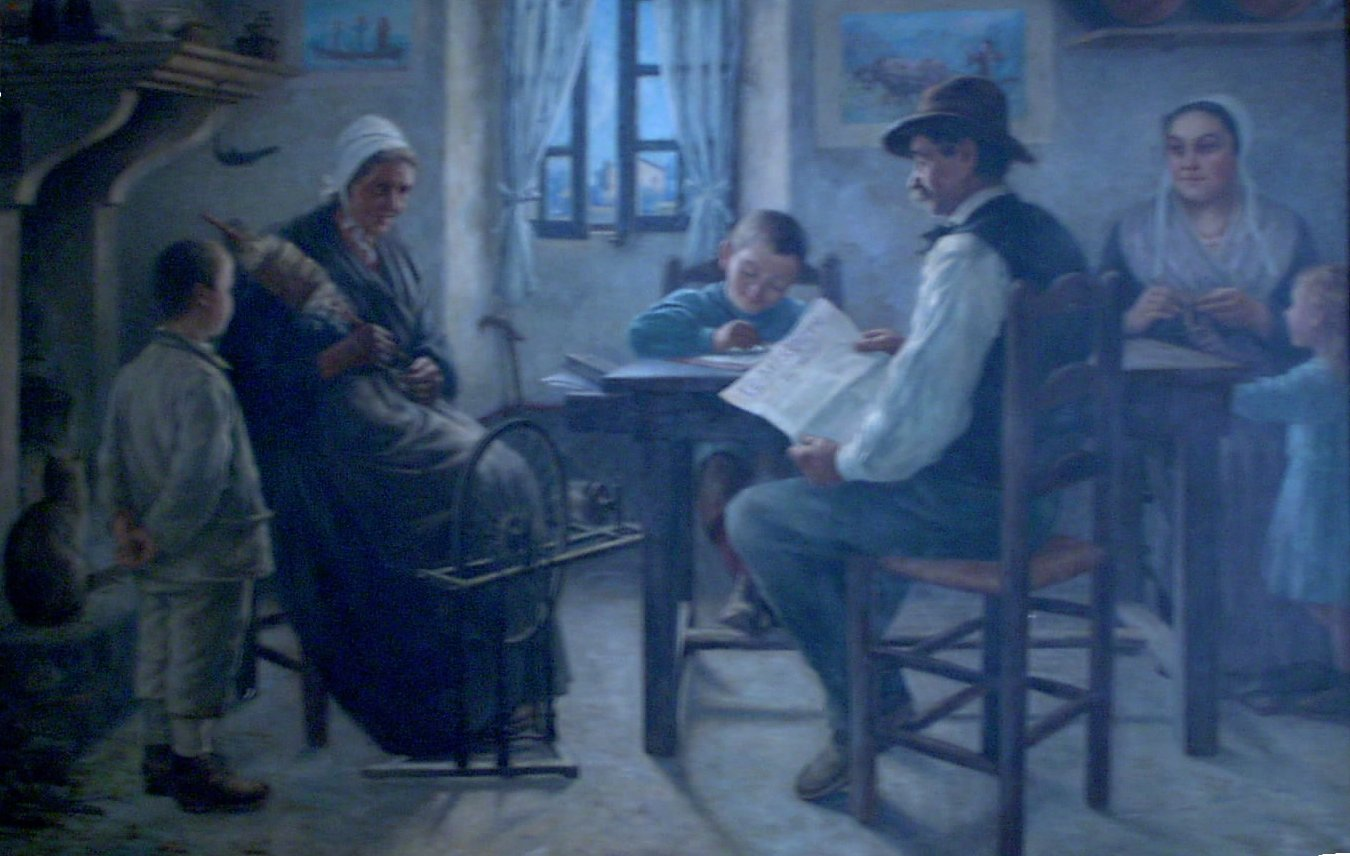
- Family scene, Monteux
- Born: Marie-Benoît Dit Benoni Auran; 13 December 1859; Monteux, France
- Died: 25 January 1944 (aged 84); Monteux, France
- Known for: Painting, drawing
- Notable work: Les Quais de la Seine à Paris; La promenade au Parc; Bergers Dans Les Calanques De Piana; Le port de Riberon; Le vieux port de Marseille

Benoît Benoni-Auran (13 December 1859 in Monteux - 25 January 1944) was a Provençal master painter.

== Biography ==
Benoni-Auran's training began at the Séminaire de Sainte-Garde in Saint-didier, Vaucluse where French painter Pierre Laplanche taught him drawing. During this period he perfected his skills in pictorial art in contact with artists Jules Laurens, Némorin Cabane and Léonce de Seynes.

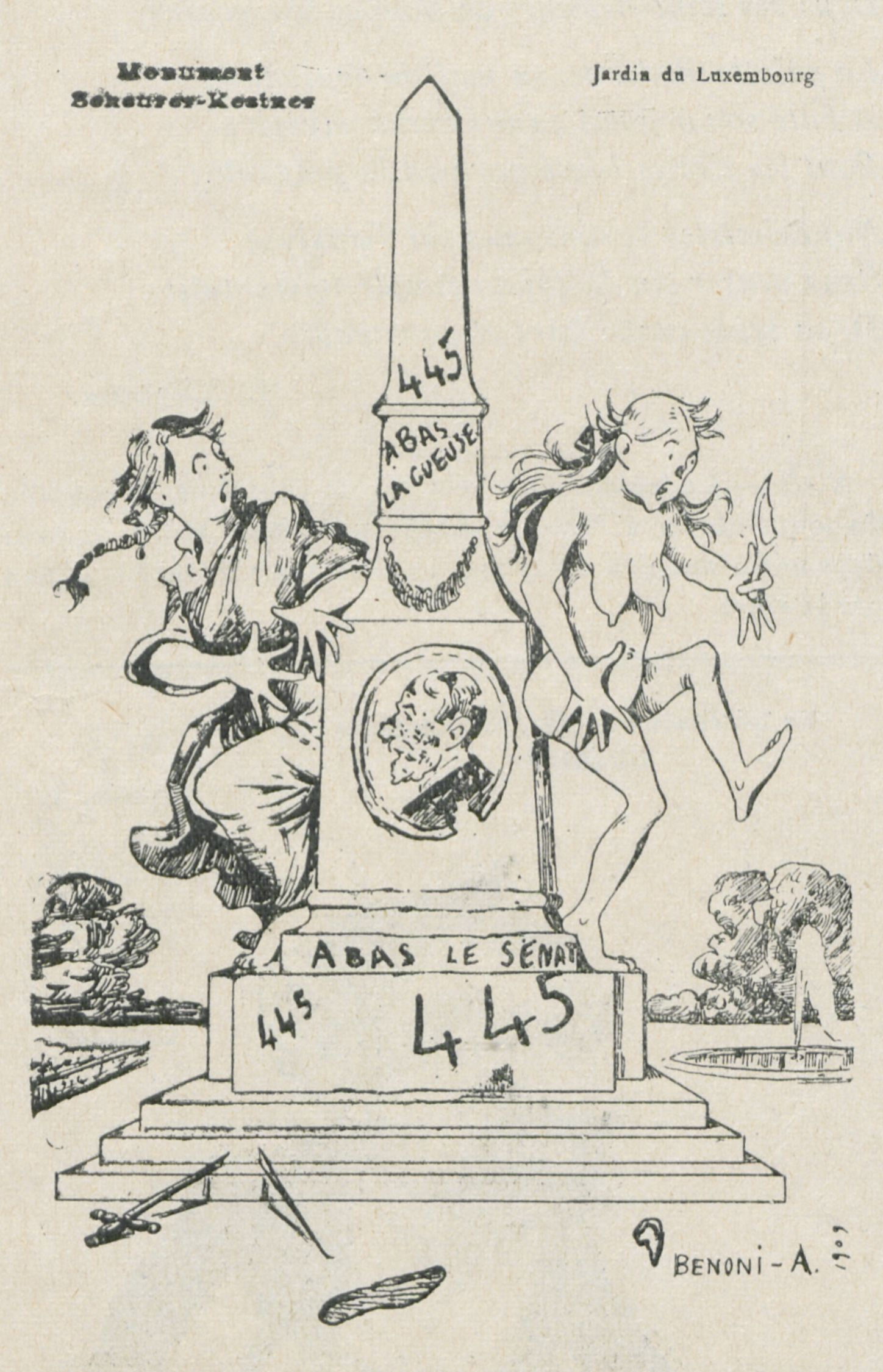
A postcard from 1909 about the royalist and anti-Dreyfus vandalism of the Scheurer-Kestner monument.

He would go on to study at École des Beaux-Arts d'Avignon (now École des Beaux-Arts d'Avignon) where he became a pupil of Pierre Grivolas and was awarded a travel grant. Around 1881, with the support of Jules Laurens, Benoni-Auran would be admitted to the Beaux-Arts de Paris and would join Alexandre Cabanel's atelier. In 1888 he joined Jean-Baptiste Lavastre's atelier where he collaborated in the creation of murals in the central dome for the Exposition Universelle (1889).

== Works ==
Some of his works are displayed in the Town Hall of Monteux.
