= Communauté d'agglomération des Sorgues du Comtat =

Sorgues du Comtat
- Communauté d'agglomération
- Interactive map of Sorgues du Comtat
- Coordinates: 44°02′N 04°58′E
- Country: France
- Region: Provence-Alpes-Côte d'Azur
- Department: Vaucluse
- No. of communes: {{{nbcomm}}}
- Established: 2001
- Area: 154.7 km^{2} (59.7 sq mi)
- Population (2019): 50,165
  - Density: 324.3/km^{2} (839.9/sq mi)
- Website: www.sorgues-du-comtat.com

Communauté d'agglomération des Sorgues du Comtat is a communauté d'agglomération, an intercommunal structure in the Vaucluse department, in the Provence-Alpes-Côte d'Azur region, southeastern France. Created in 2001, its seat is in Monteux. Its name refers to the branches of the river Sorgue and the Comtat Venaissin. Its area is 154.7 km^{2}. Its population was 50,165 in 2019.

== Composition ==
The communauté d'agglomération consists of the following 5 communes:

1. Althen-des-Paluds
2. Bédarrides
3. Monteux
4. Pernes-les-Fontaines
5. Sorgues
