= Nicolas Saboly =

French poet, composer and choirmaster (1614–1675)

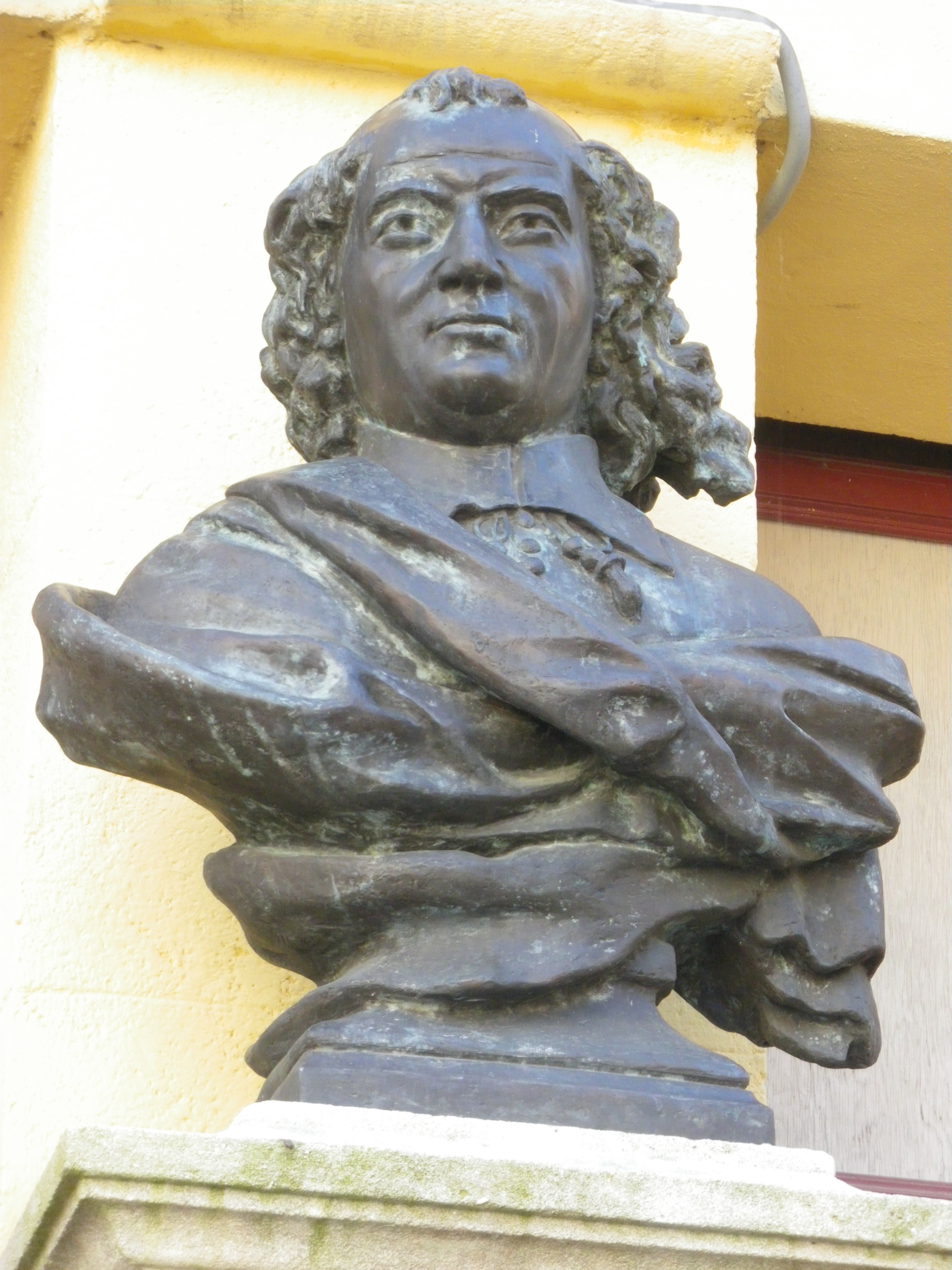
- Statue of Nicolas Saboly in Monteux, Vaucluse
- Born: 30 January 1614; Monteux, Avignon sub-region, Papal States
- Died: 25 July 1675 (aged 61); Avignon, Papal States
- Occupations: Poet, kapellmeister, composer
- Known for: Occitan language carols

Nicolas Saboly (Occitan: Micolau Sabòli, IPA: [mikuˈlaw saˈbɔli]; 30 January 1614 – 26 July 1675) was a poet, composer and choirmaster from what was then part of the Papal States. He composed many Christmas carols in Provençal Occitan which form one of the monuments of poetry in that language and have been continuously republished until the present day.

== Life ==
Nicolas Saboly was born on 31 January 1614 in Monteux to a family of herdsmen. (Note: From this origin Saboly probably drew inspiration for the pastoral scenes of his carols.) His great-grandfather Claude Saboly and his grandfather Raymond Saboly followed this occupation. It was Raymond Saboly who came to settle in Monteux. Nicolas was the youngest son of Felisa Meilheuret and Jean Saboly. (Note: Jean Saboly, father of Nicolas, was consul of Monteux in 1636. His parents were Marguerite Chinard and Raymond Saboly, and his grandparents were Marguerite Dany and Claude Saboly.) He had an older brother named Jean-Pierre Saboly and three sisters named Anne, Félicia (Felisa) and Claire.

=== Student destined for the priesthood ===
Saboly's father died on 15 August 1619, and Nicolas entered the Jesuit college of Carpentras. At the end of his schooling he became a member of the Congregation of the Annunciation of the Blessed Virgin on 14 May 1628. In the autumn of 1628 he left his college to begin taking classes at the University of Avignon. He received the tonsure in 1630 and attended courses in law and theology, as evidenced by two notarial acts of 12 March 1632 and 27 December 1633, which he witnessed as a student of theology. In 1634 he left the University without taking his degrees. On 27 September 1635 he was ordained a sub-deacon, deacon and priest.

=== Career as choirmaster ===
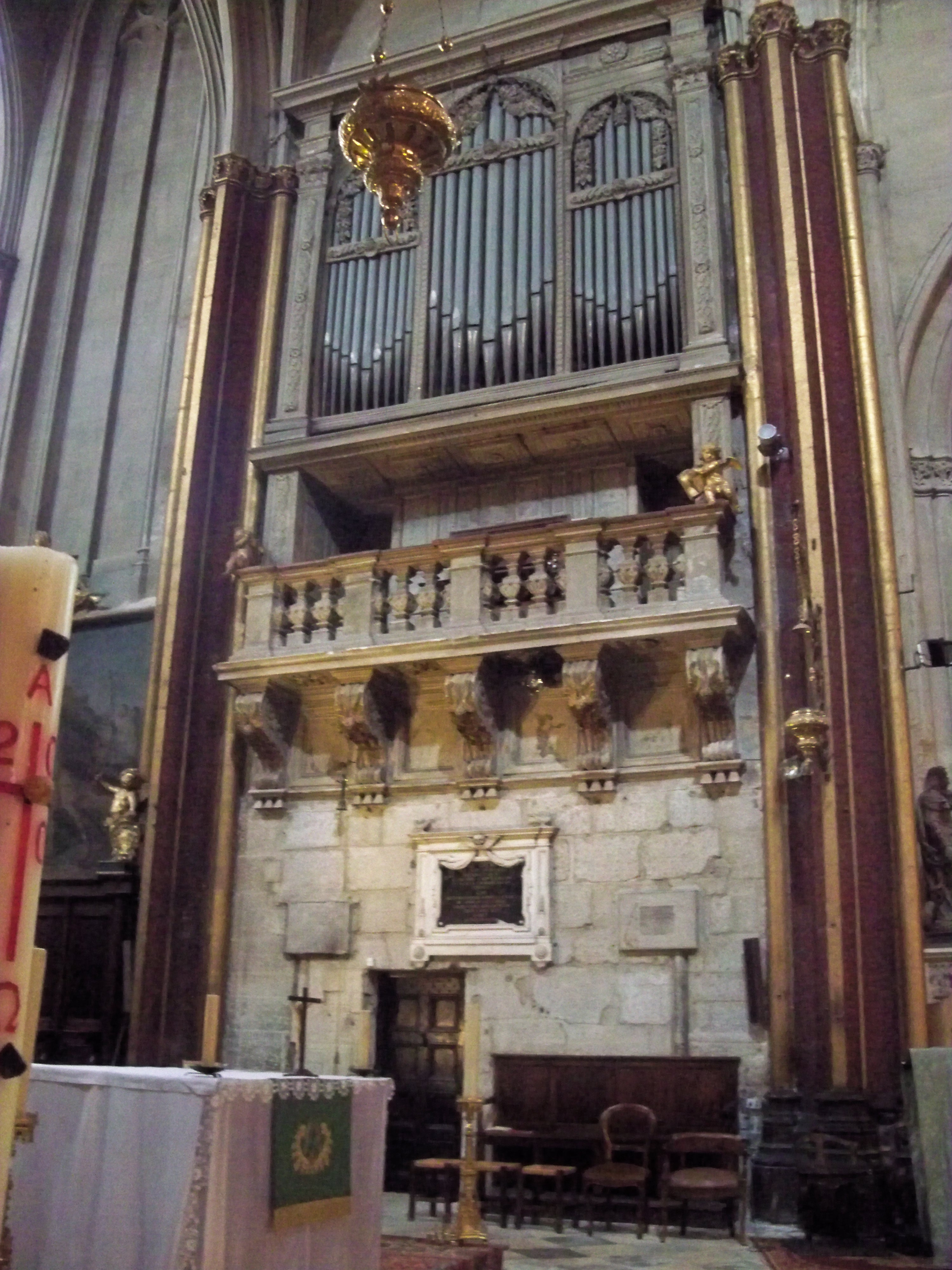
Great organ at Saint-Siffrein Cathedral in Carpentras

In 1639 Nicolas Saboly obtained the position of organist and choirmaster of the Saint-Siffrein Cathedral^{(fr)} in Carpentras. (Note: Saboly is mentioned several times in the cathedral's account book, vol. 1607–1648, with monthly wages of 3 lt. (livre tournois); he also received occasional pay for a solemn feast.) He was occasionally employed in local festivals, such as on 22 September 1639 when the clergy of Caromb asked him to play the organ for the parish festival of St. Maurice. He received 10 florins and 12 sous for his performance. (Note: Caromb AM : CC 20, vol. 21, f. 38, 1639.) His name disappears from the accounts of Saint-Siffrein after 20 June 1643, when he was replaced by the choirmaster David.

Nicolas Saboly went to Arles where he was choirmaster from 1643 to 1646, then the cathedral of Aix-en-Provence from 1652 to 1655. (Note: Cf. Aix-en-Provence AM : Comptes du Trésorier, CC 606, f. 1090v-1091v et 1116-1117, et CC 611 f. 439 et 450.) He was in Nîmes in 1659. (Note: Cf. AD Gard : Registre des Insinuations, G 907, f. 76v-77r.) He was choirmaster of the collegiate church of Saint-Pierre d'Avignon^{(fr)} from before 1668 until his death. (Note: He had deposited a first version of his will on 17 July 1668 in Avignon : cf. AD Vaucluse, notaire Lapeyre, vol. 85, f. 650.)

=== Ecclesiastical benefices ===
Like many priests of his time, Saboly obtained several ecclesiastical benefits. On 16 April 1633 he became chaplain of St. Mary Magdalene in the Cathedral of Saint Siffrein in Carpentras. He kept this benefice until 1663. (Note: Carpentras, Acts of the secretariat of the Bishop. Benefice attributed by the grand vicaire Villardi on the resignation of Pierre Julliani.) On 28 March 1658 he was issued a certificate of studies that found he had attended courses at the University of Avignon from 1628 to 1634, and was given a certificate of aptitude for obtaining profits in the dioceses of Nîmes and Uzès.

On 10 June 1660, after a lengthy process, he obtained a pension of 100 lt. (livre tournois) from the papal administration to take on the priory and the benefit of Saint-Benoît-de-Cayran in the diocese of Uzès. (Note: His relations with the pontifical administration of Avignon were far from being serene since Nicolas Saboly in 1662 wrote a satire of 35 couplets (of eight octosyllabic verses each) against it.) After returning to Avignon he obtained the chaplaincy of Saint Mary, which he still held in 1663.

=== Testament and death ===
On 21 April 1671 Saboly's will was notarized by François Julien in Marseilles. Saboly made his niece Claire Saboly (wife of Christophe Chardenas, bourgeois of Roquemaure, Gard) ) his universal heiress. He also bequeathed 600 lt. to his servant Isabeau Sevique, and reserved from his niece's legacy an annuity with 600 lt. of capital yielding 30 lt. annually to be paid to the chapter of Saint-Pierre d'Avignon so that after his death two masses would be said each week in his memory. He died four years later on 25 July 1675 in Avignon. He is buried in the choir of the Saint-Pierre church.

Saboly's career as a choirmaster was standard for this period. He is famous for the carols that he composed.

== Works ==
=== Manuscript works ===
- Bastide collection. Manuscript collection of 220 carols with music notes, in Provencal and French, compiled and written by Joseph Bastide, surgeon from Avignon, at the beginning of the 18th century. In-4 °, 500 p. Contains almost all of Saboly's compositions except for numbers 6, 11, 34, 49, 62, 64, 67.
- Carpentras BM: Ms. 384. Collection of French and Provencal poetry, 17th century. 4 °, 144 f. This collection contains pieces by Saboly and has been entirely attributed to him, wrongly. See the discussion of authenticity in Faury 1876, Part 2.
- Two polyphonic masses in the manuscript Carpentras BM: Ms. 1267, probably written during his post at Saint-Siffrein;
- Two motets

=== Printed works ===
==== First editions in fascicle ====
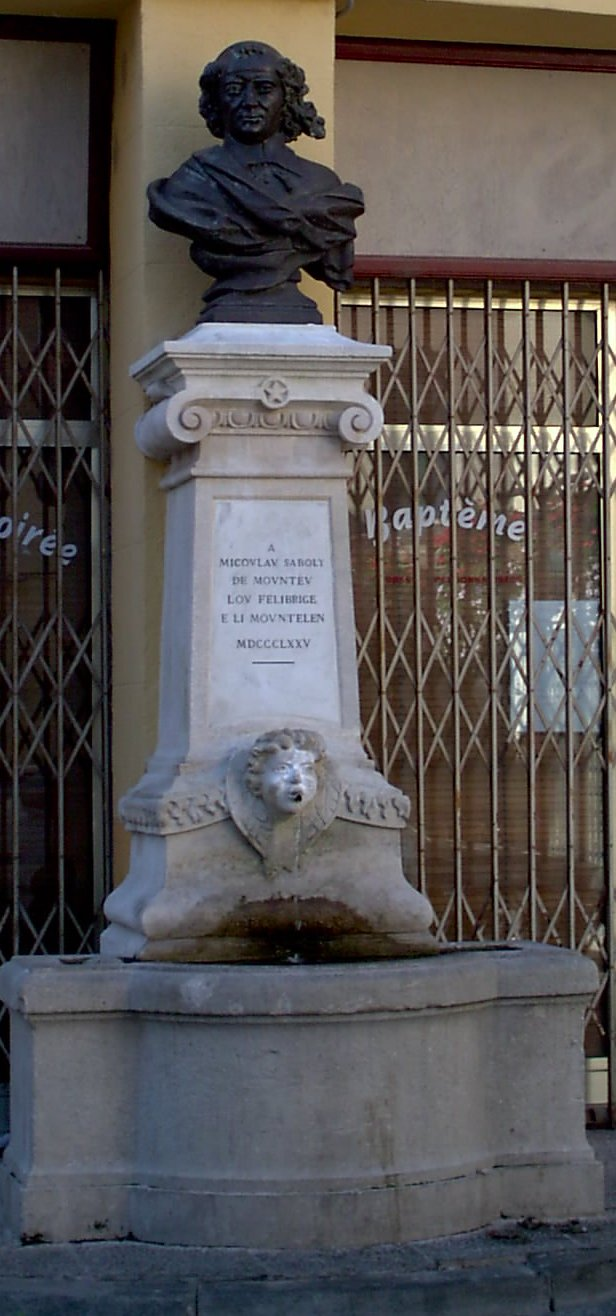
À Monteux, fontaine surmontée du buste de Nicolas Saboly

The first editions of Saboly's carols consist of eight bound instalments, dated between 1668 and 1674, kept in Paris Ars. : BL 9478. The titles of the instalments are:

- Lei Noé de San Pierre. Avignon : Pierre Offray, 1668. 12°.
- Lei Noé de San Pierre. Avignon : Pierre Offray, 1669. 12° read online.
- Lei Noé de San Pierre. De l'année 1669. Avignon : 1669. 12° read online.
- Histori de la naissenso dou fis de Diou, composado en Noé, per N. Saboly... Avignon : 1670. 12° read online.
- Noés nouveous de l'an M.DC.LXXI. Composas per Nicolas Saboly... Avignon : Michel Chastel, 1671. 12°, 16 p. read online.
- Noés nouveous de l'an M.DC.LXXII. Composas per... Avignon : 1672. 12°, 16 p.
- Noés nouveous de l'an M. DC.LXXIII... Avignon : 1673. 12°, 16 p.
- Noés nouveous de l'an M. DC.LXXIV... Avignon : 1674. 12°, 16 p.

==== Editions collected in one volume ====
- Recueil des noëls provenceaux composez par le sieur Nicolas Saboly. Avignon : Michel Chastel, 1699. 12°, 100 p. Paris BNF : YE-12578.
- Recueil des noëls provenceaux composez par le sieur Nicolas Saboly Avignon : F. Mallard et F. Domergue, 1724. 2e éd. 12°, 100 p. Paris BNF.
- Recueil des noëls provenceaux composez par le sieur Nicolas Saboly... Avignon : J. Molière, 1737. 3e éd. 12°, 99 p. Paris BNF. Online on Gallica.
- Recueil des noëls provenceaux composé par le sr Nicolas Saboly,... Nouvelle édition, augmentée du Noël fait à la mémoire de M. Saboly, et de celui des Rois, fait par J.-F. D*** [Joseph-François Domergue]. Avignon : impr. de F.-J. Domergue, 1763. 12°, 112 p.
- Idem. Avignon : T. F. Domergue le jeune, 1772. 12°, 114 p.
- Idem. Avignon : J. T. Domergue, 1774. 12°, 120 p.
- Recueil de Noëls provençaux composés par le sieur Nicolas Saboly. Avignon : Jean Chaillot, 1791. 12°.
- Recueil de noëls provençaux, composés par le sieur Nicolas Saboly... Nouvelle édition, augmentée du noël fait à la mémoire de M. Saboly, & de celui des Rois, fait par J. F. Domergue, doyen d’Aramon. Carpentras : Gaudibert-Penne, 1803. 12°, 120 p.
- Idem. Avignon : Jean Chaillot, 1804. 12°, 132 p.
- Idem. Avignon : Jean Chaillot, 1807. 12°, 132 p.
- Idem. Avignon : Chaillot Aîné, 1820. 12°, 132 p.
- Idem. Avignon : Chaillot aîné, 1824. 12°, 132 p. Online on Google Books.
- Idem. Avignon : Offray aîné, 1854. 12°, 132 p.
- Idem. Avignon : Peyri, 1854. 12°, 132 p. Online on Google Books.
- Recueil des Noels composés en langue provençale... Nouvelle édition... publiée pour la première fois avec les airs notés... par Fr. Seguin. Avignon : Fr. Seguin aîné, 1856. Partition 2°, L-87 p., mus. Online on Gallica. Édition réimprimée en 1897.
- Nouvè de Micolau Saboly avec une préface de Frédéric Mistral. Avignon : Aubanel frères, 1865.
- Vint-un Nouvè causi de Micolau Saboly (1614-1675), édition du Tricentenaire présentée par Pierre Fabre et Robert Allan, publication de l'Institut vauclusien d'études rhodaniennes. Vedène : Comptoir général du livre occitan, 1975.
- Li Nouvè di Rèire de Nicolas Saboly. Berre L'Etang : C.I.E.L d'Oc, s.d. Disponible en en PDF.
- Recueil des Noëls provençaux, Lou Reviro-meinage, Œuvres complètes de Nicolas Saboly, présentation, traduction, notes Henri Moucadel. Montfaucon : A l'asard Bautezar !, 2014, 448 p.

==== Editions in collection with other authors ====
In the second part of the 19th century Saboly's were often published with those of Antoine Peyrol (18th century) and Joseph Roumanille (1818-1891). These many editions reflect the literary movement of the Félibriges. The list below is not exhaustive.

- Li nouvè de Saboly, Peyrol, Roumanille em'un peçu d'aquéli de l'abat Lambert em'uno mescladisso de nouvè vièi e nóu e de vers de J. Reboul. Edicioun revisto e adoubado pèr lou felibre de la Miougrano emé la bono ajudo dóu felibre de Bello-visto. Avignon : Aubanel, 1858. 18°, 228 p.
- Li Nouvè de Saboly e de Roumanille. Em’un bon noumbre de viei Nouvè que soun esta jamai empremi. Edicioun nouvello, revisto coume se dèu. Avignon : Joseph Roumanille, 1865 (impr. adm. Gros frères). 8°, VIII-160 p. Online on Gallica.
- Li nouvè de Saboly, de Peyrol e de J. Roumanille. Em'un bon noumbre de vièi Nouvè que se canton en Prouvènço. Edicioum nouvello, revisto coume se dèu. Avignon : Joseph Roumanille, 1879. 12°, viii-163 p.
- Li Nouvè de Micoulau Saboly e di Felibre... em'uno charradisso pèr Frederi Mistral. Avignon : Aubanel, 1869. 12°, 182 p.
- Li nouvè de Saboly, de Peyrol e de J. Roumanille... Avignon : Joseph Roumanille, 1873. 12°, 129 p.
- Li nouvè de Saboly, de Peyrol e de J. Roumanille... Em'un bon noumbre de vièi Nouvè que se canton en Prouvènço. Avignon : Joseph Roumanille, 1879. 12°, VIII-163 p. Online on Gallica.
- Li nouvè de Saboly de Peyrol e de J. Roumanille... IVe editcioun. - Avignon : Joseph Roumanille, 1887. 8°, 164 p.

== List of carols ==
Saboly did not compose all the Christmas carols that were attributed to him. They were originally published without music because they were sung to popular tunes that everyone knew by heart. Saboly simply gave a note like "on the air of the echo", "on the air of the pastouro" or sometimes "On an air by Saboly".

The Provencal Documentation Center has retained in its booklet devoted to this author a list of 48 carols definitely composed by Saboly.

Following are the carols are according to the François Seguin edition of 1856:

First book (1667)

1. Iéu ai vist lou Piemount [original melody, 1660]
2. Bon Diéu! la grand clarta [original melody]
3. Micoulau noste pastre [melody: Nicolas va voir Jeanne]
4. Ai! quouro tournara lou tèms [melody: Quand reviendra-t-il le temps]
5. Li a proun de gènt que van en roumavage [melody: Toulerontonton]
6. Un pau après lei tempouro [melody: L'autre jour, dans sa colère]
7. Ça menen rejouissènço [melody: Quand vous serez]
8. Viven urous e countènt [melody: Vivons heureux et contents]
9. Per noun langui long dou camin [melody: Allant au marché ce matin]
10. Ai! la bono fourtuno [melody: Montalay n'est pas fière]
11. Pièisque l'ourguei de l'umano naturo [original melody]
12. Venès lèu vèire la pièucello [melody: Qu'ils sont doux, bouteille jolie (air de Lully pour le Malade imaginaire)]

Second book (1668)

13. Ai proun couneigu [melody: Pargai puisqu'enfin]
14. Chut! teisas-vous [air de l'Echo, également connu sous le nom de Tarare-Pon-pon]
15. Ourguhious plen de magagno [melody: Tircis caressait Chimène]
16. Diéu vous gard', noste mèstre [melody: Ce n'est qu'un badinage]
17. Vers lou pourtau Sant-Laze [melody: Il faut pour Endremonde]
18. Helas! qu'noun aurié pieta [original melody]

Third book (1669)

19. Li a quaucarèn que m'a fa pòu [melody: On a beau faire des serments]
20. L'Ange qu'a pourta la nouvello [air d'un menuet]
21. Nàutre sian d'enfant de cor [air du Traquenard]
22. Tòni, Guihèn, Peiroun [melody: Tout mon plus grand plaisir]
23. Un bèu matin, veguère uno accouchado [melody: Tu me défends de publier ma flamme]
24. Cerqués plus dins un marrit establo [air de la Bohémienne]

Fourth book, titled "Story of the birth of Jesus Christ" (1670)

25. Dòu tèms de l'empèri rouman [melody: Berger, va-t-en à tes moutons]
26. Hòu! de l'oustau! mèstre, mestresso [original melody]
27. Lou queitivié d'aquéu marrit estable [melody: peut-on douter?]
28. Sus lou coutau [melody: Dis-moi, Grisel]
29. Lei pastourèu [melody: Dans ce beau jour]
30. Soun tres ome fort sage [melody: Je ne m'aperçois guère]
31. Lei Mage dins Jerusalèn [melody: Non, je ne vous dirai pas]
32. La fe coumando de crèire [original melody]

Fifth book (1671)

33. Lei plus sage - Dòu vesinage [melody: Est-on sage?]
34. Lei pastre fan fèsto [melody: Aimable jeunesse]
35. Sant Jòusè m'a dit [melody: Noste paure cat (Saboly?)]
36. Ben urouso la neissènço [melody: Toujours l'amour me tourmente)
37. Aque ange qu'es vengu [melody: Un jour le berger Tircis]
38. Despièi lou tèms [air de l'Opéra]
39. Se vàutrei sias countènt [melody: Vous dirai bèn soun noum]

Sixth book (1672)

40. Me siéu plega - E bèn amaga [air du Postillon]
41. Que disès, mei bon fraire [melody: Tout rit dans nos campagnes]
42. Jujas un pàu de quinto sorto [melody: C'est un plaisir dans le bel âge]
43. Uno estello [melody: La bouteille - Me réveille]
44. Quand la miejo-nue sounavo [melody: Iéu n'aviéu uno chambriero]
45. Un ange a fa la crido [original melody]

Seventh book (1673)

46. Pastre dei mountagno [air de la Pastouro]
47. Lorsque vous sarés malaut [melody: Si vous êtes amoureux]
48. Auprès d'aquel estable [melody: Tan matin sies levado]
49. Adam e sa coumpagno [melody: Amants, quittez vos chaînes]
50. Jèsu, vous sias tout fioc e flamo [melody: Siéu pas ama]
51. Pastre, pastresso [melody: Vàutrei, fiheto, qu'avès de galant]
52. Venès vèire dins l'estable [melody: Dans le fond de ce bocage]
53. Tu que cerques tei delice [sic] [melody: Amarante est jeune et belle]
54. Vesès eici moun Nouvelisto [unknown melody]

Eighth book (1674)

55. Proufitas-me lèu, bravo bregado [melody: Changerez-vous donc?]
56. Touro-louro-louro! lou gau canto [air de Bourgogne]
57. L'estrange deluge [melody: Malgré tant d'orages]
58. Vos-tu qu'anen en Betelèn [melody: Chambriero, te vos-tu louga?]
59. Qu'vòu faire grand journado [melody: Qu'on passe en douceur sa vie]
60. Segnour, n'es pas resounable [melody: Jeunes cœurs, laissez-vous prendre]
61. Per vèire la jacènt [melody: Se Jano me vòu mau]
62. Sortez d'ici, race maudite [original melody]

Additions in the 1704 edition

63. En sourtènt de l'estable [original melody]
64. Guihaume, Tòni, Pèire [original melody]
65. A la ciéuta de Betelèn [original melody]
66. Un ange dòu cèu es vengu [air dei Boudougno] (débute par "Veici lou gros serpènt" dans l'éd. de 1704)
67. Sus! campanié, revihas-vous [air d'un carillon (Saboly)]; également attribué à Louis Puech
68. Noun vous amusés en cansoun [unknown melody]

Unpublished carols from the Bastide collection

1. Fau que l'envejo me passe - De rire de tout moun sadou
2. Vous tourmentès plus lou cervèu
3. Desespièi l'aubo dòu jour - Iéu ause dire
4. Iéu siéu Toumas, mai sariéu redicule
5. La naturo e lou pecat - Soun pire que chin a cat
6. Viras, viras de carriero - Bèu soulèu

Fragments from the Bastide collection

7. Sian eici dous enfant de cor
8. Bourtoumiéu, me vos-tu crèire?
9. Enfin Diéu es vengu
10. Se li a quaucun doute
11. Bonjour, bonjour, bello bregado
12. Un maset plen d'aragnado
13. Quinto bugado - Avié fa noste paire Adam

Other carols often attributed to Saboly (partial list)

- À la ciéuta de Betelèn
- Adam qu'ères urous
- Aquel ange qu'es vengu
- Bèn urouso la neissènço
- Bergié qu'abitas dins la plano
- De bon matin pèr la campagno
- De matin ai rescountra lou trin (Domergue)
- Frustèu, esfato ti roupiho
- Iéu, ai moun fifre
- La vèio de Nouvè (Peyrol)
- Revèio-te, Nanan (Bruel)
- Nàutrei sian tres bòumian (Puech)
- Qu'aquéu jour es urous
- Un ange a crida (Peyrol)

Famous carols

- La marche des Rois (attributed to Saboly, but certainly by Joseph-François Domergue)
- La Cambo me fai mau
- La Coupo Santo: the carol composed on Guihaume, Tòni, Pèire was used with a slight rhythmic variation and words by Frédéric Mistral to make the Coupo Santo, the Provençal anthem.

== Opinions about Nicolas Saboly and his work ==
The Provençals take Saboly for Christmas as they take eggs for Easter and for Palm Sunday take a gratin of chickpeas.

— Frédéric Mistral

One cannot understand all the delicacy of Saboly's Christmas poetry if it is separated from the music. The lyrics are, in fact, so closely related to the melody that there is only one way to read them, which is to sing them.

— J. B. Faury

Saboly, thanks to his carols, has become a real classic of Occitan literature; it is almost certain that in no other language can such an Attic perfection be found in such a simply popular manner.

— Professeur Charles Camproux, de l'Université de Montpellier

Saboly's style could be compared to that of La Bellaudière, as Pascal's prose could be compared to that of Montaigne

— François Seguin

Nicolas Saboly is, with Bellaud de la Bellaudière, a golden link in the chain that unites Mistral to the troubadours.

— Bruno Durand, conservateur de la Bibliothèque Méjanes d'Aix-en-Provence.

Saboly's influence was considerable: he was one of the masters of Roumanille and Mistral.

— Charles Rostaing, professeur à la Sorbonne, et René Jouveau, capoulier du Félibrige

His work contains an emotion tinged with good-nature that does not exclude certain political allusions and a merry mockery. He combined the inspiration of the Middle Ages with the knowledge of La Fontaine.

— André Bouyala d'Arnaud, conservateur de la Bibliothèque de la ville de Marseille

== Sources ==
- Boudin, Auguste (1848), Lou Soupa de Saboly : poème provençal historique précédé d'une notice sur Saboly (in French), Avignon: Seguin aîné
- Boudin, Auguste (1867), Testament de Nicolas Saboly... : publié pour la première fois avec une notice sur ce célèbre auteur de Noëls provençaux et le fac-simile d'un de ses Noëls autographe et inédit (in French), Avignon: Aubanel
- Bouyala d'Arnaud, André (1962), Santons et traditions de Noëls en Provence (in French), Marseille: Ed. Tacussel
- Camproux, Charles (1971), Histoire de la littérature occitane (in French), Paris
- Durand, Bruno (1963), "Saboly", 'Visages de la Provence (in French), Paris: Éd. Horizon de France
- Faury, J. P. (1876), Saboly, étude littéraire et historique, avec un examen du manuscrit conservé à la Bibliothèque d'Inguimbert (in French) (reprint Geneva 1971 ed.), Avignon: Roumanille
- Lafont, Robert; Anatole, Christian (1970), Nouvelle histoire de le littérature occitane (in French), Toulouse/Paris: IEO/PUF
- Rostaing, Charles; Jouveau, René (1972), Précis de littérature provençale (in French), Saint-Rémy-de-Provence
- Seguin, ed. (1856), Recueil des noels composés en langue provençale (in French), Preface by Fr. Seguin aîné (Nouvelle édition... publiée pour la première fois avec les airs notés... par Fr. Seguin ed.), Avignon: Fr. Seguin aîné
- Westrup, Jack A. (1940), "Nicolas Saboly and his "Noëls provençaux"", Music and Letters (21): 34–49, doi:10.1093/ml/XXI.1.34
