= Bédarrides =

- Commune
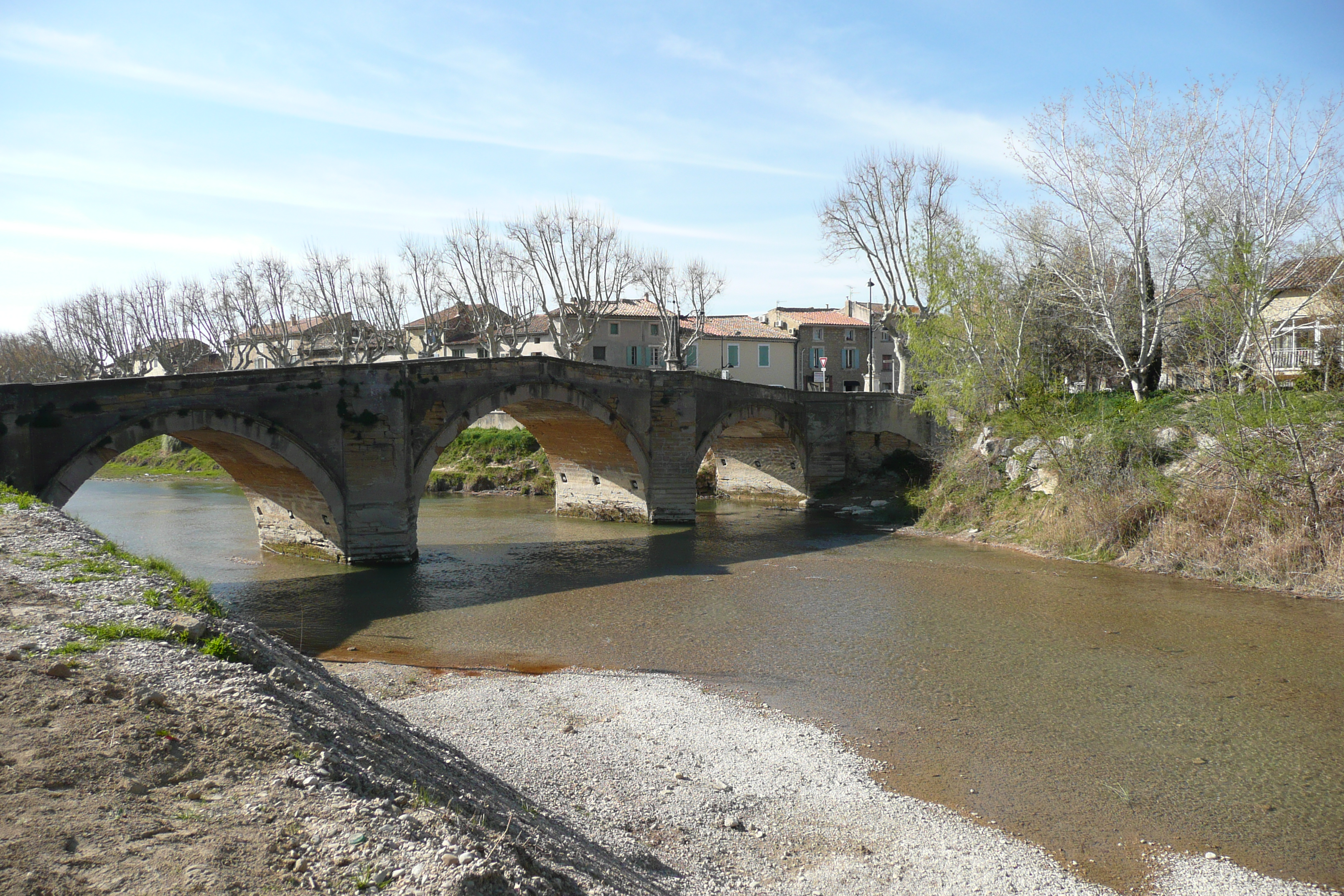
- Bridge over the Ouvèze

- Coat of arms
- Location of Bédarrides
- Location within France Location within Provence-Alpes-Côte d'Azur
- Coordinates: 44°02′29″N 4°53′55″E
- Country: France
- Region: Provence-Alpes-Côte d'Azur
- Department: Vaucluse
- Arrondissement: Avignon
- Canton: Sorgues
- Intercommunality: CA Sorgues du Comtat

Government
  - Mayor (2020–2026): Jean Berard
- Area^{1}: 24.79 km^{2} (9.57 sq mi)
- Elevation: 25 m (82 ft)
- Highest elevation: 119 m (390 ft)
- Lowest elevation: 20 m (66 ft)
- Population (2023): 5,671
  - Density: 228.8/km^{2} (592.5/sq mi)
- Time zone: UTC+01:00 (CET)
  - Summer (DST): UTC+02:00 (CEST)
- INSEE/Postal code: 84016 /84370
- ^{1} French Land Register data, which excludes lakes, ponds, glaciers > 1 km^{2} (0.386 sq mi or 247 acres) and river estuaries.

Bédarrides (French pronunciation: [bedaʁid]; Provençal: Bedarrida) is a commune in the Vaucluse department in the Provence-Alpes-Côte d'Azur region in southeastern France.

== Name ==
The settlement is attested as villa Betorrida in 814, Biturrita in 898, Bisturrita in 903, Beddurida in 908, and Bederrida in 1274.

== Population ==
Historical population
Year	Pop.	±% p.a.
1968	2,986	—
1975	3,816	+3.57%
1982	4,238	+1.51%
1990	4,816	+1.61%
1999	5,110	+0.66%
2007	5,103	−0.02%
2012	5,111	+0.03%
2017	5,171	+0.23%
2023	5,671	+1.55%
Source: INSEE

== See also ==
- Communes of the Vaucluse department
