= Canton of Monteux =

Coordinates: 44.03°N 5.00°E

- Canton
- Situation of the canton of Monteux in the department of Vaucluse
- Country: France
- Region: Provence-Alpes-Côte d'Azur
- Department: Vaucluse
- No. of communes: {{{nbcomm}}}
- Population (2023): 37,055
- INSEE code: 8410

The canton of Monteux is an administrative division of the Vaucluse department, in southeastern France. It was created at the French canton reorganisation which came into effect in March 2015. Its seat is in Monteux.

It consists of the following communes:

1. Althen-des-Paluds
2. Beaumes-de-Venise
3. Caromb
4. Entraigues-sur-la-Sorgue
5. Monteux
6. Saint-Hippolyte-le-Graveyron
7. Sarrians
