= Pernes-les-Fontaines =

Pernes-les-Fontaines Pèrnas dei Fònts (Occitan)
- Commune
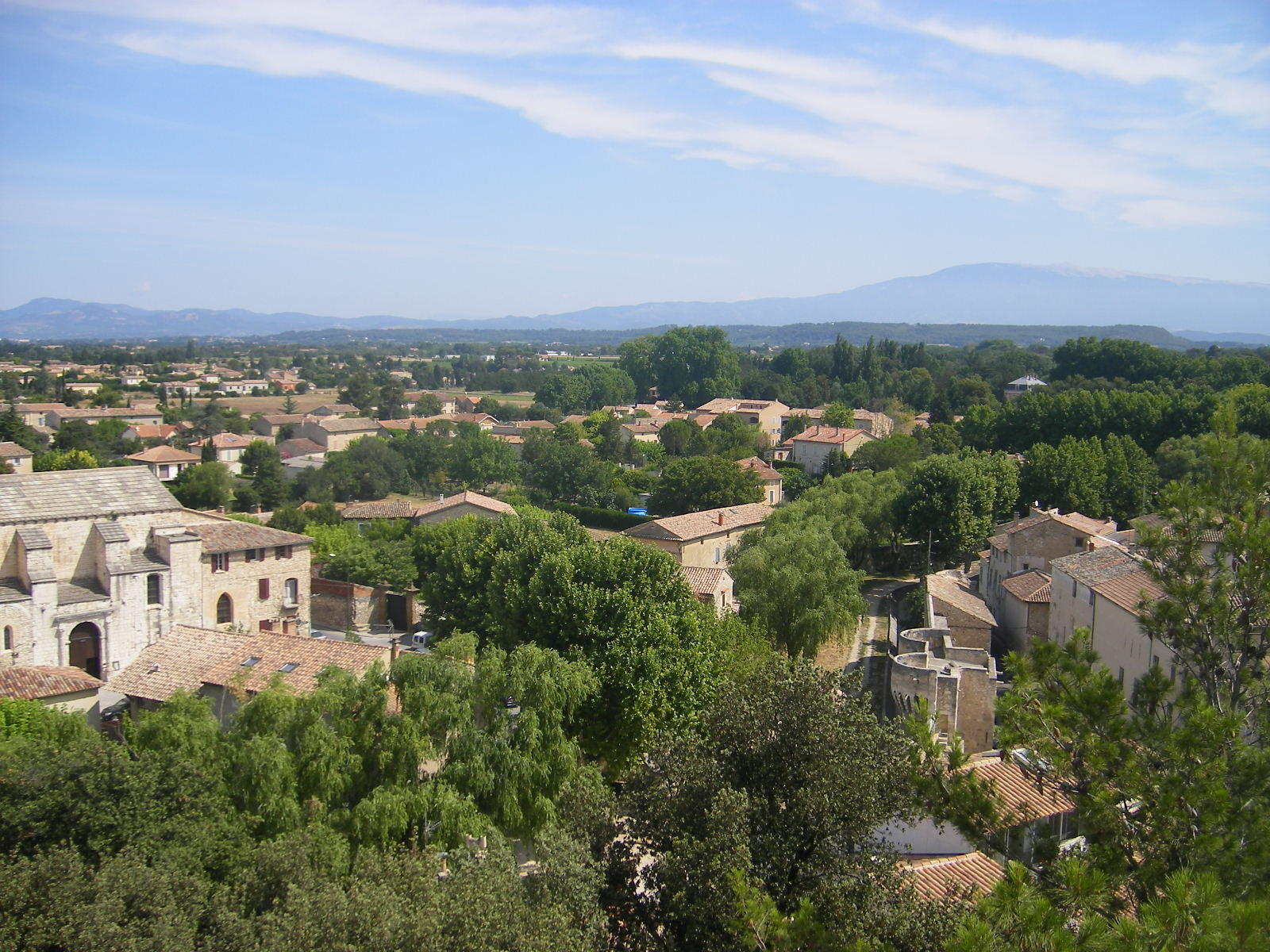
- A view of Pernes-les-Fontaines

- Coat of arms
- Location of Pernes-les-Fontaines
- Location within France Location within Provence-Alpes-Côte d'Azur
- Coordinates: 43°59′55″N 5°03′35″E
- Country: France
- Region: Provence-Alpes-Côte d'Azur
- Department: Vaucluse
- Arrondissement: Carpentras
- Canton: Pernes-les-Fontaines
- Intercommunality: CA Sorgues du Comtat

Government
  - Mayor (2020–2026): Didier Carle
- Area^{1}: 51.12 km^{2} (19.74 sq mi)
- Elevation: 82 m (269 ft)
- Highest elevation: 263 m (863 ft)
- Lowest elevation: 36 m (118 ft)
- Population (2023): 10,504
  - Density: 205.5/km^{2} (532.2/sq mi)
- Time zone: UTC+01:00 (CET)
  - Summer (DST): UTC+02:00 (CEST)
- INSEE/Postal code: 84088 /84210
- ^{1} French Land Register data, which excludes lakes, ponds, glaciers > 1 km^{2} (0.386 sq mi or 247 acres) and river estuaries.

Pernes-les-Fontaines (French pronunciation: [pɛʁn le fɔ̃tɛn]; officially Pernes until 1936; Occitan: Pèrnas dei Fònts or simply Pèrnas) is a commune in the southeastern French department of Vaucluse.

== Population ==
Historical population
Year	Pop.	±% p.a.
1968	5,560	—
1975	6,088	+1.30%
1982	6,961	+1.93%
1990	8,304	+2.23%
1999	10,170	+2.28%
2007	10,506	+0.41%
2012	10,429	−0.15%
2017	9,620	−1.60%
2023	10,504	+1.48%
Source: INSEE

Its inhabitants are called Pernois and Pernoises in French.

== People related to Pernes-les-Fontaines ==
- Esprit Fléchier (1632–1710)
- Esprit Antoine Blanchard (1696–1770)
- Charles Giraud (1802–1885)
- Paul de Vivie (1853–1930)
- Daniel Sorano (1920–1962)
- Ahmad Jamal (born 1930)
- Jean Ragnotti (born 1945)
- Richard Descoings (1958–2012)

== See also ==
- Communes of the Vaucluse department
