= Entraigues-sur-la-Sorgue =

Entraigues-sur-la-Sorgue Entraigas de Sòrga (Occitan)
- Commune
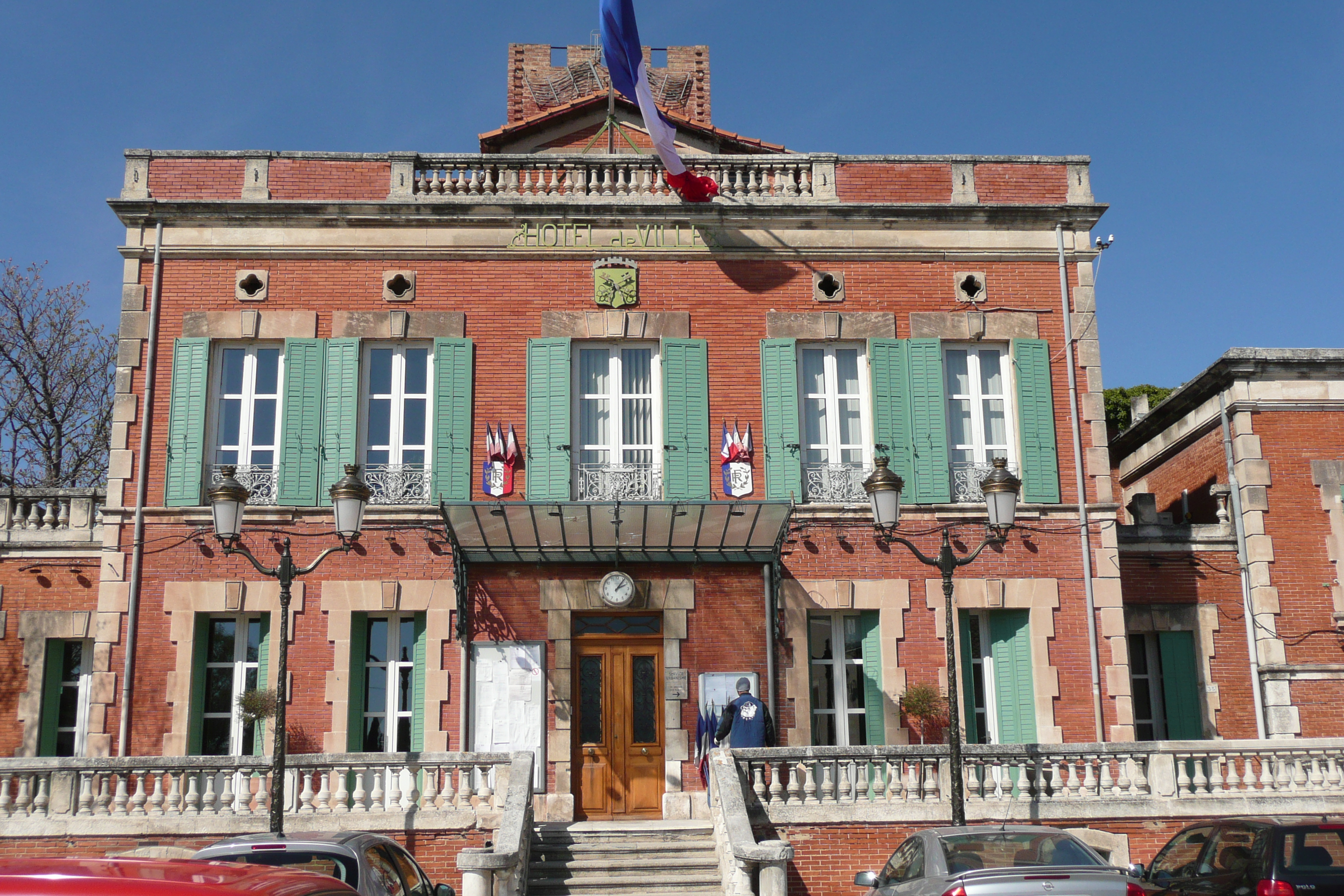
- Entraigues-sur-la-Sorgue Town Hall

- Coat of arms
- Location of Entraigues-sur-la-Sorgue
- Location within France Location within Provence-Alpes-Côte d'Azur
- Coordinates: 44°00′13″N 4°55′38″E
- Country: France
- Region: Provence-Alpes-Côte d'Azur
- Department: Vaucluse
- Arrondissement: Avignon
- Canton: Monteux
- Intercommunality: CA Grand Avignon

Government
  - Mayor (2020–2026): Guy Moureau
- Area^{1}: 16.57 km^{2} (6.40 sq mi)
- Elevation: 29 m (95 ft)
- Highest elevation: 42 m (138 ft)
- Lowest elevation: 20 m (66 ft)
- Population (2023): 8,913
  - Density: 537.9/km^{2} (1,393/sq mi)
- Time zone: UTC+01:00 (CET)
  - Summer (DST): UTC+02:00 (CEST)
- INSEE/Postal code: 84043 /84320
- ^{1} French Land Register data, which excludes lakes, ponds, glaciers > 1 km^{2} (0.386 sq mi or 247 acres) and river estuaries.

Entraigues-sur-la-Sorgue (French pronunciation: [ɑ̃tʁɛg syʁ la sɔʁg]; Occitan: Entraigas de Sòrga, before 1993: Entraigues) is a commune in the Vaucluse department in the Provence-Alpes-Côte d'Azur region of Southeastern France.

== Population ==
Historical population
Year	Pop.	±% p.a.
1968	3,357	—
1975	4,900	+5.55%
1982	5,335	+1.22%
1990	5,788	+1.02%
1999	6,612	+1.49%
2007	7,473	+1.54%
2012	8,038	+1.47%
2017	8,472	+1.06%
2023	8,913	+0.85%
Source: INSEE

== See also ==
- Communes of the Vaucluse department
