= Fontaine-de-Vaucluse =

Fontaine-de-Vaucluse La Fònt de Vauclusa (Occitan)
- Commune
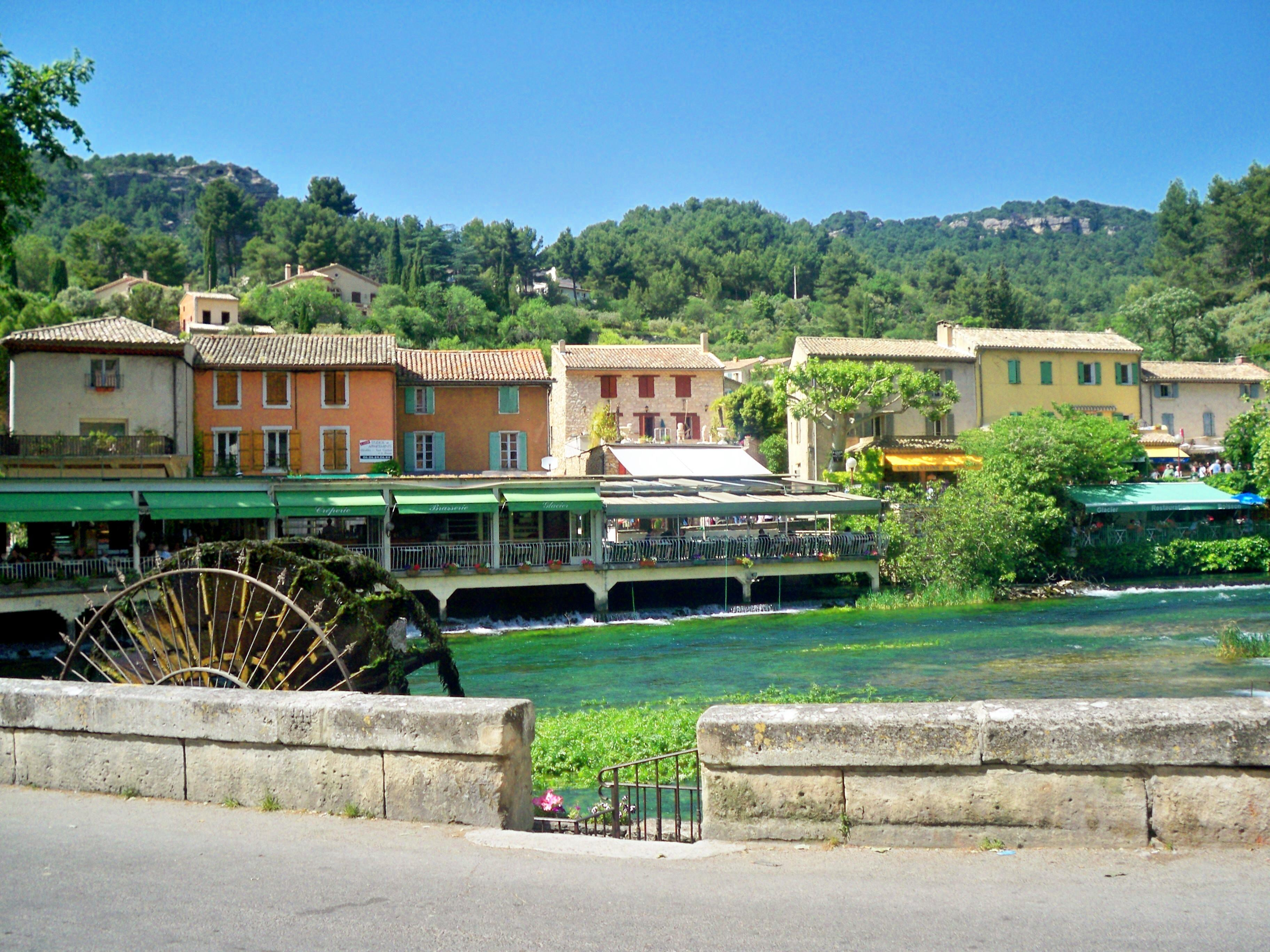
- The village of Fontaine-de-Vaucluse, with the river in the foreground

- Coat of arms
- Location of Fontaine-de-Vaucluse
- Location within France Location within Provence-Alpes-Côte d'Azur
- Coordinates: 43°55′23″N 5°07′37″E
- Country: France
- Region: Provence-Alpes-Côte d'Azur
- Department: Vaucluse
- Arrondissement: Avignon
- Canton: L'Isle-sur-la-Sorgue
- Intercommunality: Pays des Sorgues et des Monts de Vaucluse

Government
  - Mayor (2020–2026): Patricia Philip
- Area^{1}: 7.14 km^{2} (2.76 sq mi)
- Elevation: 80 m (260 ft)
- Highest elevation: 652 m (2,139 ft)
- Lowest elevation: 68 m (223 ft)
- Population (2023): 585
  - Density: 81.9/km^{2} (212/sq mi)
- Time zone: UTC+01:00 (CET)
  - Summer (DST): UTC+02:00 (CEST)
- INSEE/Postal code: 84139 /84800
- ^{1} French Land Register data, which excludes lakes, ponds, glaciers > 1 km^{2} (0.386 sq mi or 247 acres) and river estuaries.

Fontaine-de-Vaucluse (French pronunciation: [fɔ̃tɛn də voklyz]; Occitan: La Fònt de Vauclusa or simply Vauclusa) is a commune in the southeastern French department of Vaucluse. Its name comes from the spring of the same name; the name Vaucluse itself comes from the Latin phrase vallis clausa or "closed valley".

== Heraldry ==
The coat of arms of the village of Fontaine-de-Vaucluse is:

"Blue, with a Trout and a Grayling, poised horizontally." (Victor Adolphe Malte-Brun, in France Illustrated, book V, 1884)

== Geography ==
=== Situation ===
River Sorgue in
Fontaine-de-Vaucluse
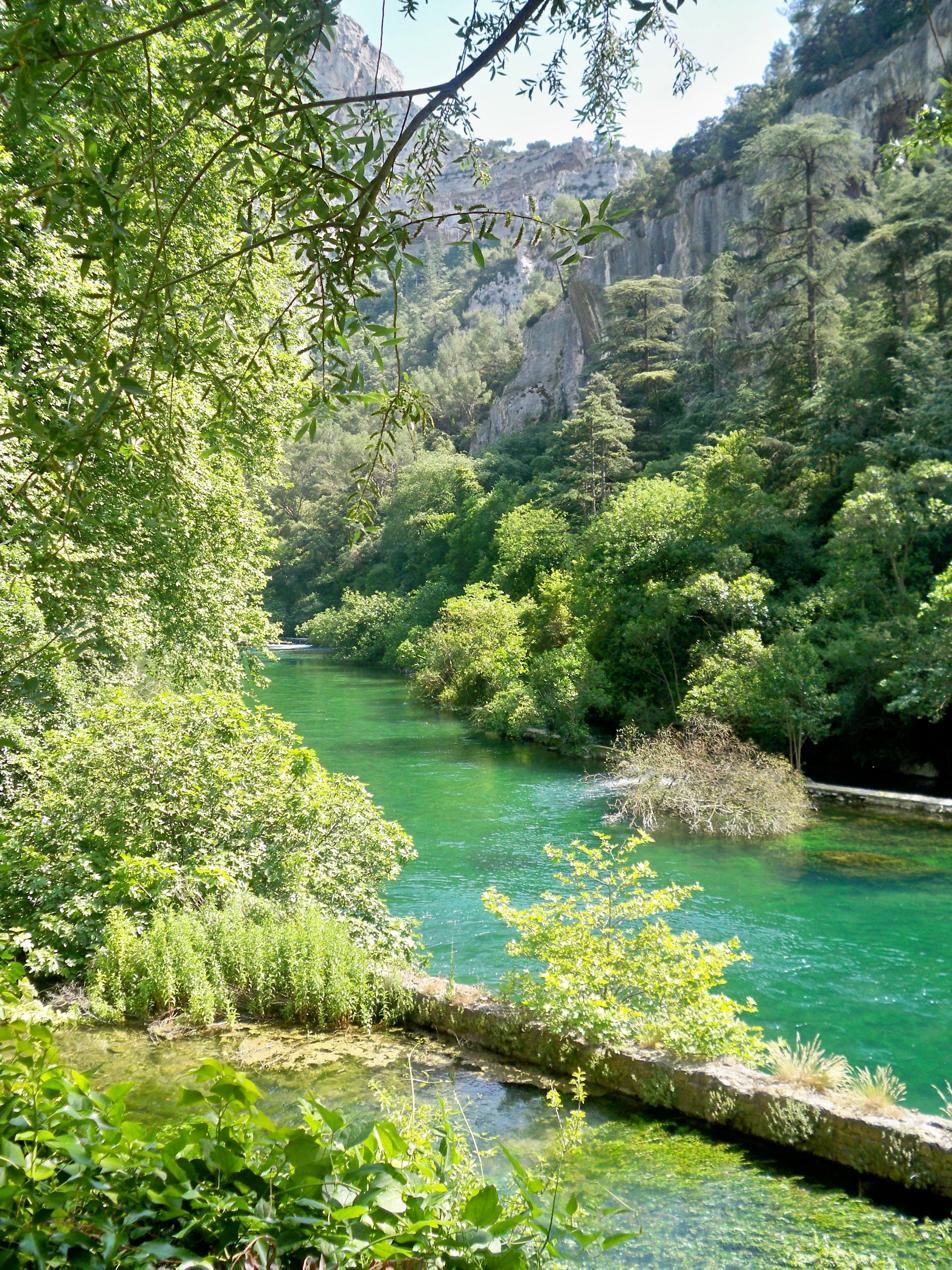
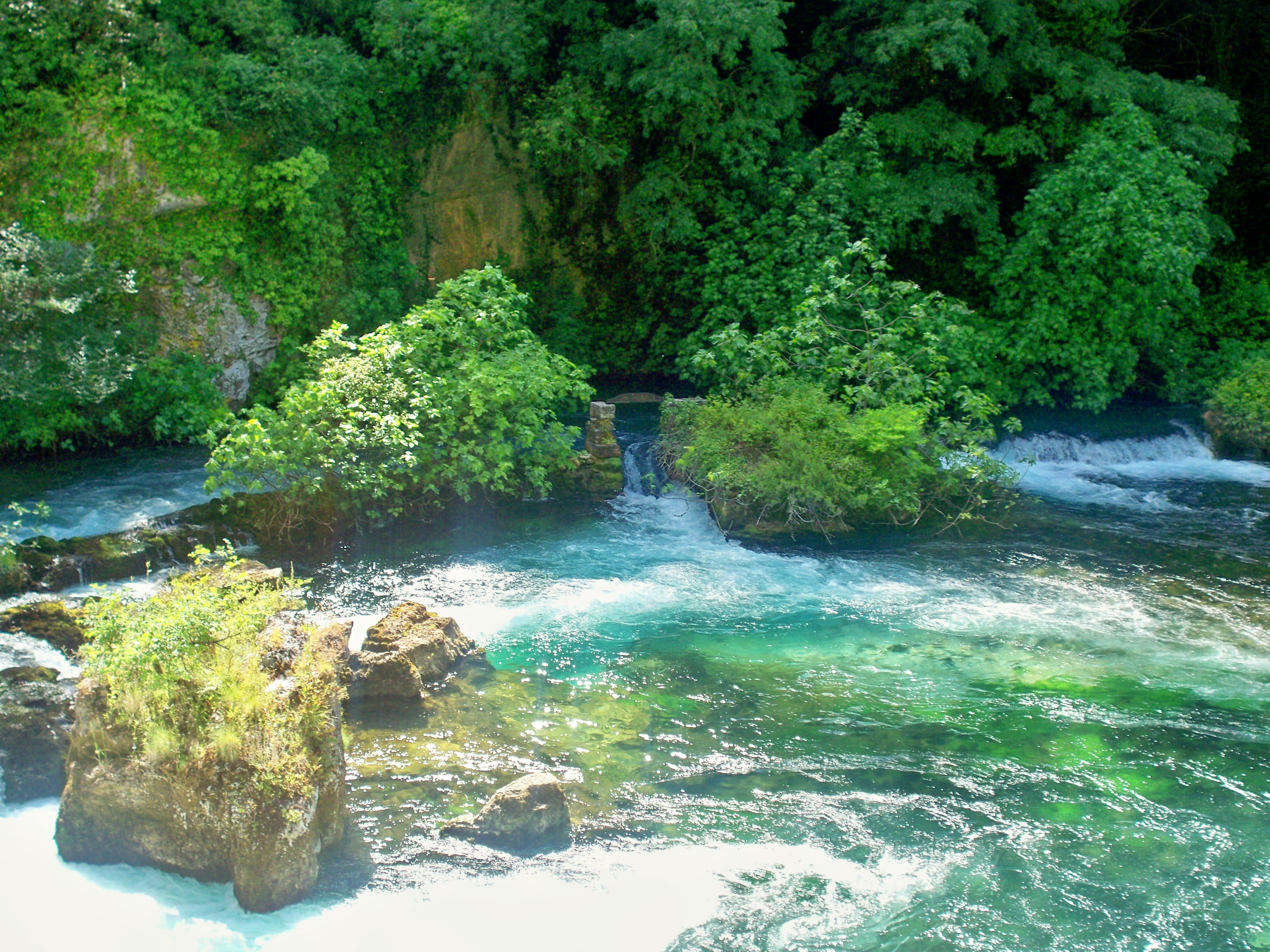

Fontaine-de-Vaucluse ("spring of Vaucluse") is built around the Fontaine de Vaucluse, a spring in a valley at the foot of the Vaucluse Mountains, between Saumane-de-Vaucluse and Lagnes, not far from L'Isle-sur-la-Sorgue. It is named after the spring, the source of the river Sorgue.

=== Hydrography ===
The fountain, or spring, of Vaucluse, situated at the feet of a steep limestone cliff 230 metres high, the biggest spring in France. It is also the fifth largest in the world with an annual flow of 630 million cubic metres, or an average of 71918 m3 per hour.

The fountain of Vaucluse surges in March for about 5 weeks and then subsides. The increased flow of water swells the Sorgue to flood. The mechanism behind the surging remains somewhat of a mystery.

== History ==
This village of about 600 inhabitants was once called Vaucluse or the "closed valley" (Vallis Clausa in Latin) and gave its name to the French department of Vaucluse. Several trails indicate human occupation in the area since the Neolithic. Its spring has been the object of a major cult since Antiquity, and the Sorgue was used as a trade route by the Phoenicians of Massalia and later the Romans. Following some major discoveries from two cave dives by the SSFV, two archaeological sites under the protection of the SRA PACA has allowed more than 1600 antique coins from the first century BC to the 5th century AD to be brought back up to the surface.

During the Early Middle Ages, in the 6th century, the hermit Saint Veran is said to have lived on the spot. Miracles attributed to him led to his being consecrated as Bishop of Cavaillon. His successor, Walcaudus, received the consent of the ruling counts of the area to settle monks there. A monastery was constructed, but was in ruins by the 11th century. Clement, the Bishop of Cavaillon, ordered its reconstruction by Isarn, abbot of Sainte-Victoire.

In the Late Middle Ages, the poet Petrarch made it his preferred residence in the 14th century, writing, "The illustrious source of the Sorgue, famous for itself long ago, became even more famous by my long stay and my songs." (Petrarch, Seniles, X, 2).

The poet left in 1353 after his son's death. The village was razed shortly afterward by bandits, who withdrew at the sight of the intimidating episcopal seat. A museum stands on the spot of Petrarch's house today, and the town is twinned with Arquà Petrarca, where the poet died. Following this attack, the village and valley fell into oblivion. Thought of as a wild place, it was avoided through the 16th and 17th centuries. Vaucluse was again popularized by a duel between the famous Honore Gabriel Riqueti and Louis-Francois de Galliffet. A letter published by Riqueti brought fame to the area again, and a column was built to honour Petrarch in the eighteenth century.

In 1946, Jacques Cousteau and another diver nearly died while searching for the bottom of the spring due to contamination of their air supply by carbon monoxide.

== Population ==
Historical population
Year	Pop.	±% p.a.
1968	698	—
1975	532	−3.81%
1982	604	+1.83%
1990	580	−0.51%
1999	610	+0.56%
2007	680	+1.37%
2012	653	−0.81%
2017	604	−1.55%
2023	585	−0.53%
Source: INSEE

== Places and monuments ==
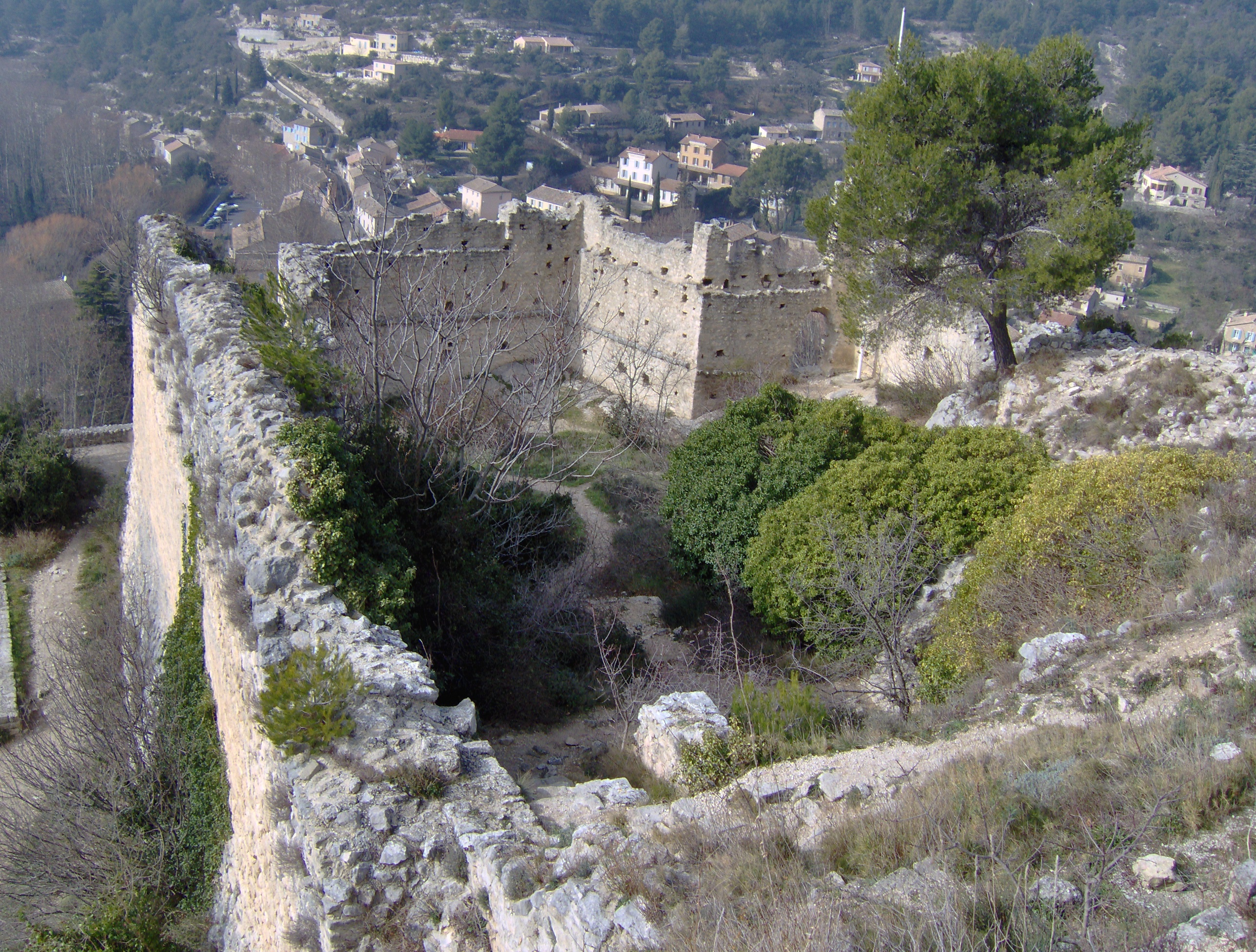
Château de Fontaine de Vaucluse

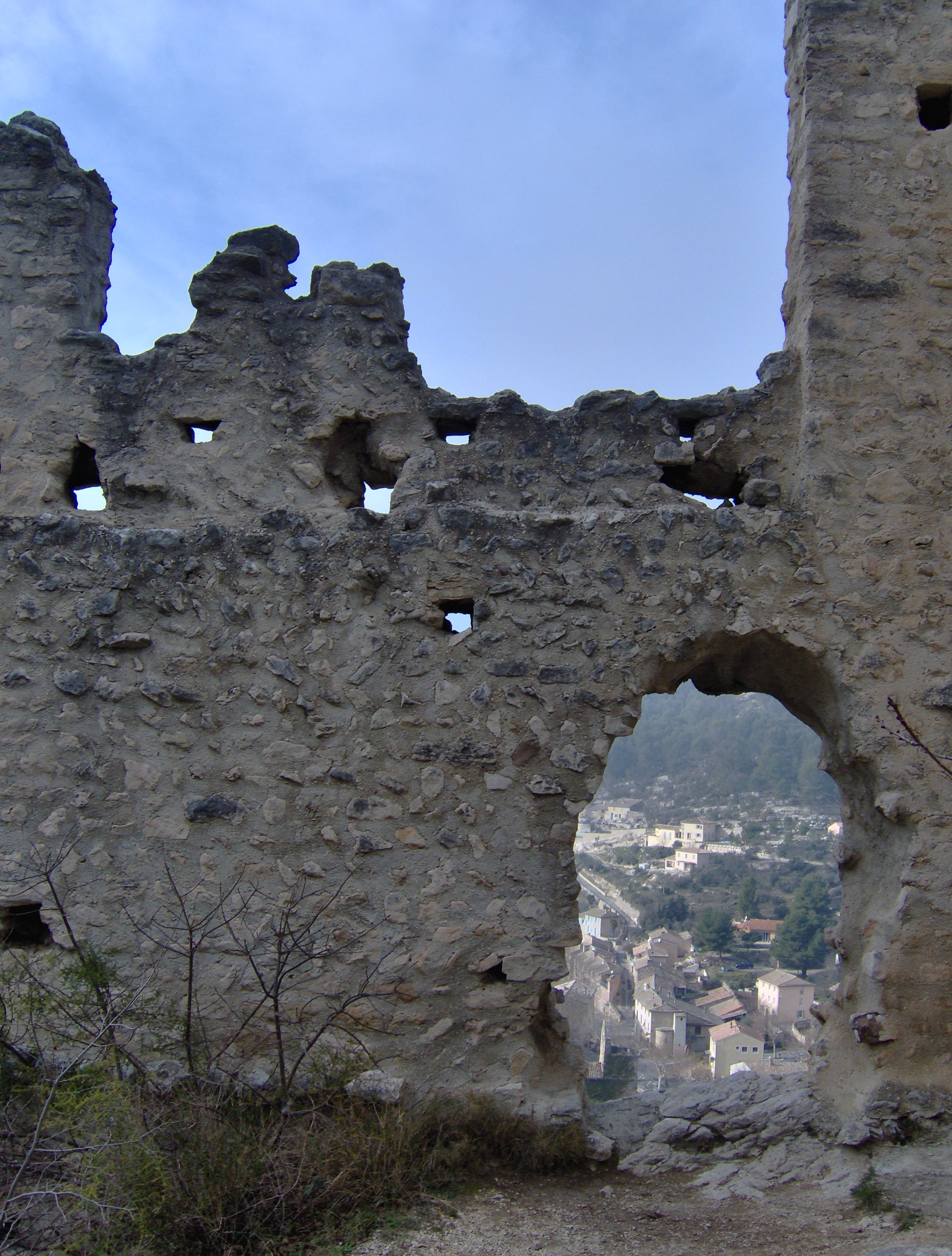
Porte du Château

- The principal point of interest is the source of the Sorgue at the foot of a cliff 240 metres high: Its average flow is 22 m^{3} / second, the highest in France, and can attain 110 m^{3} after the snow melts. It wasn't until 1985 that the mystery of its origin was partially revealed: in effect, the lowest point is at -308m depth attained by a robot belonging to the Spelunking Society of Fontaine de Vaucluse. The spring is the only exit point of a subterranean basin of 1200 km^{2} that collects the water from Mont Ventoux, the Vaucluse mountains and from the Lure mountain.
- Ruins of the castle of the Bishop of Cavaillon
- Ancient paper mill Mill Vallis Clausa
- Museum of the Resistance
- Petrarch museum (on the site of his former house)
- Santon museum

== People related to Fontaine-de-Vaucluse ==
The following people are related to Fontaine-de-Vaucluse:

- Veranus of Cavaillon
- Philippe de Cabassoles
- Fernand Meyssonnier
- Petrarch

== Gallery ==
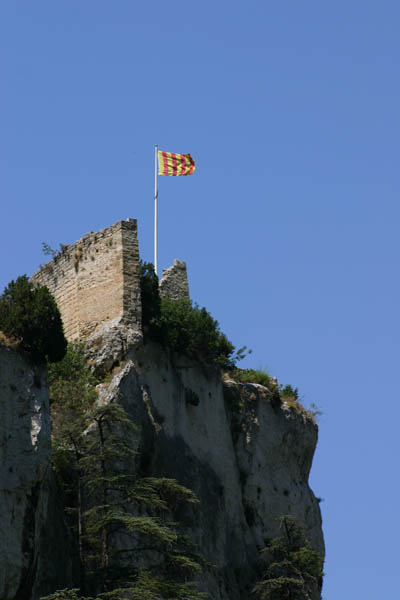
Ruins of the castle

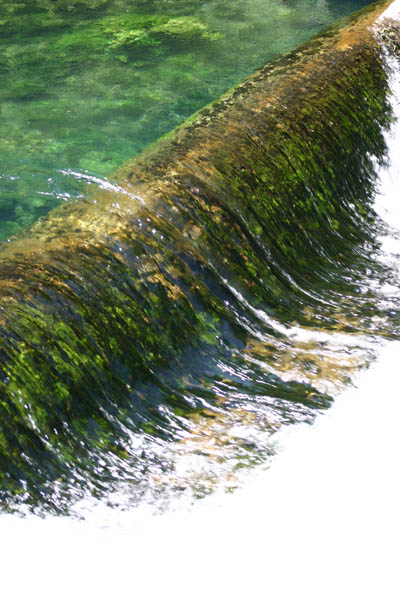
The flowing of the water

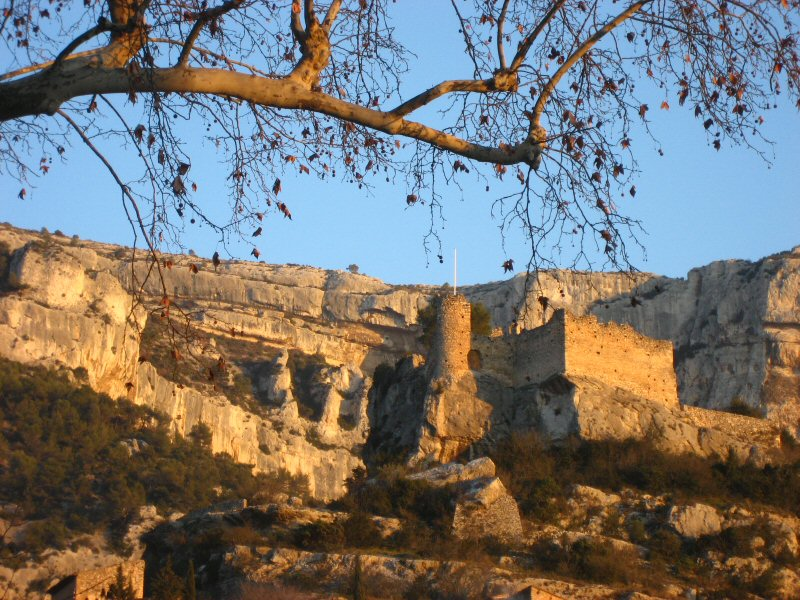
Bishop of Cavaillon's castle, overhanging the village

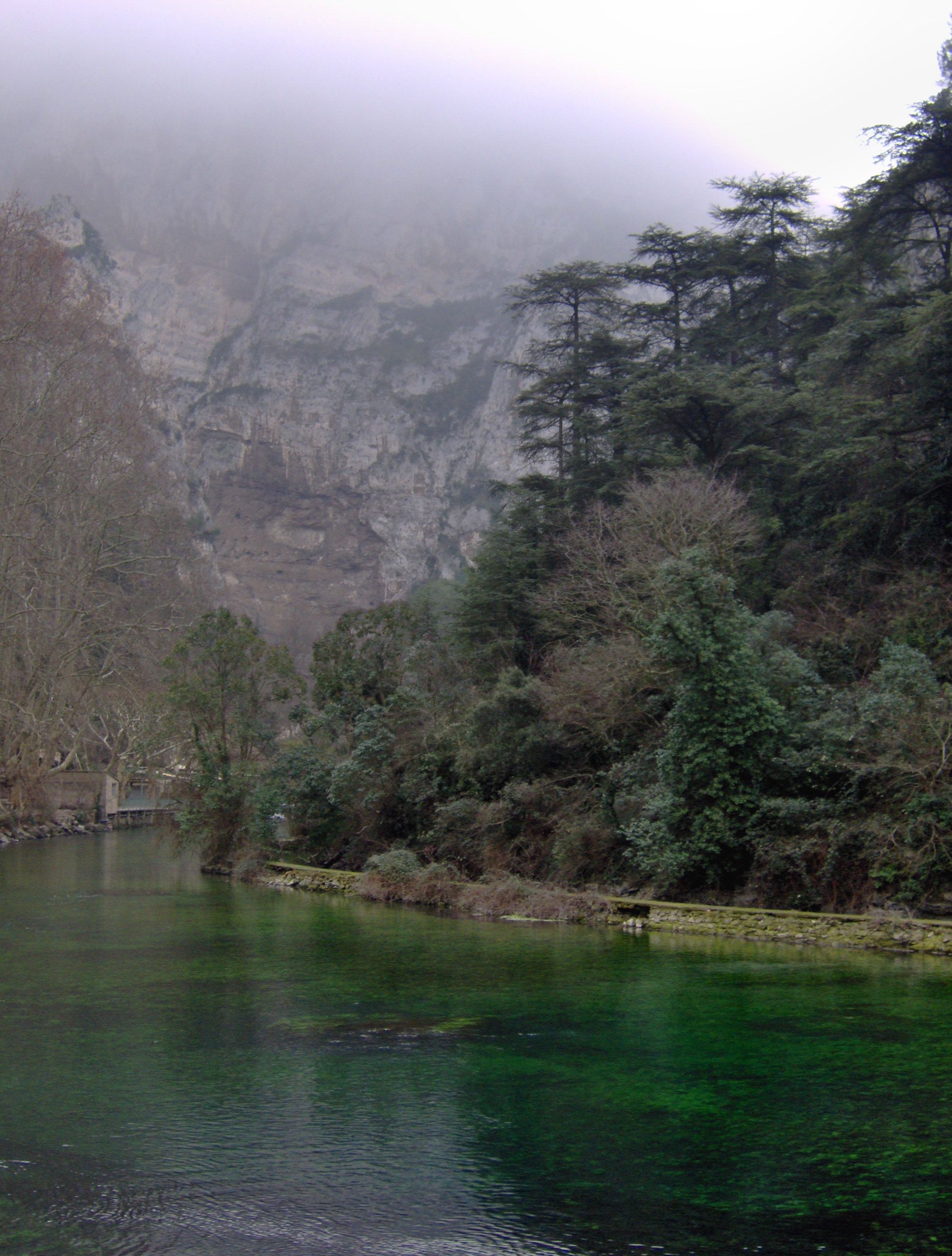
The Sorgue shrouded in fog

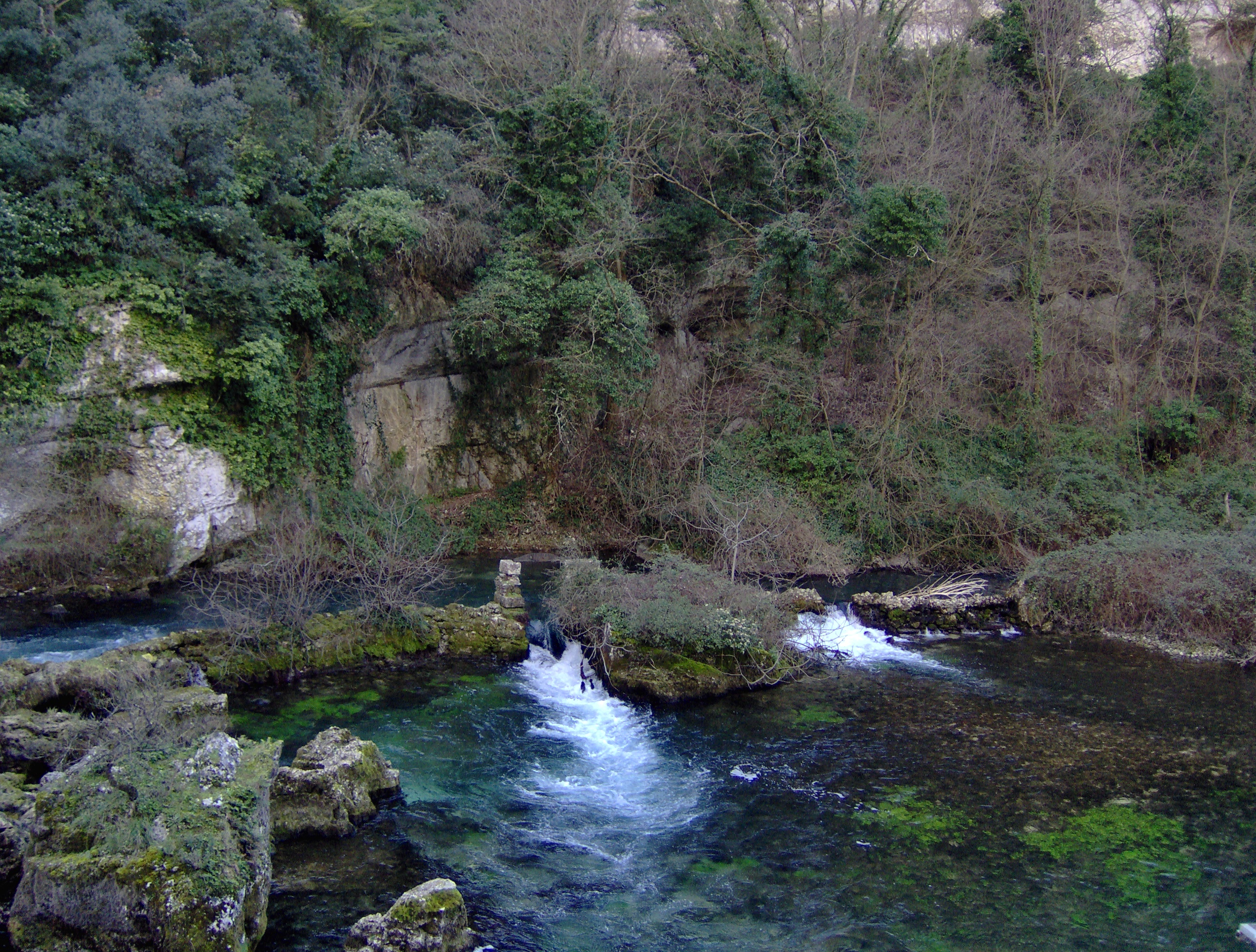
The Sorgue in Fontaine-de-Vaucluse

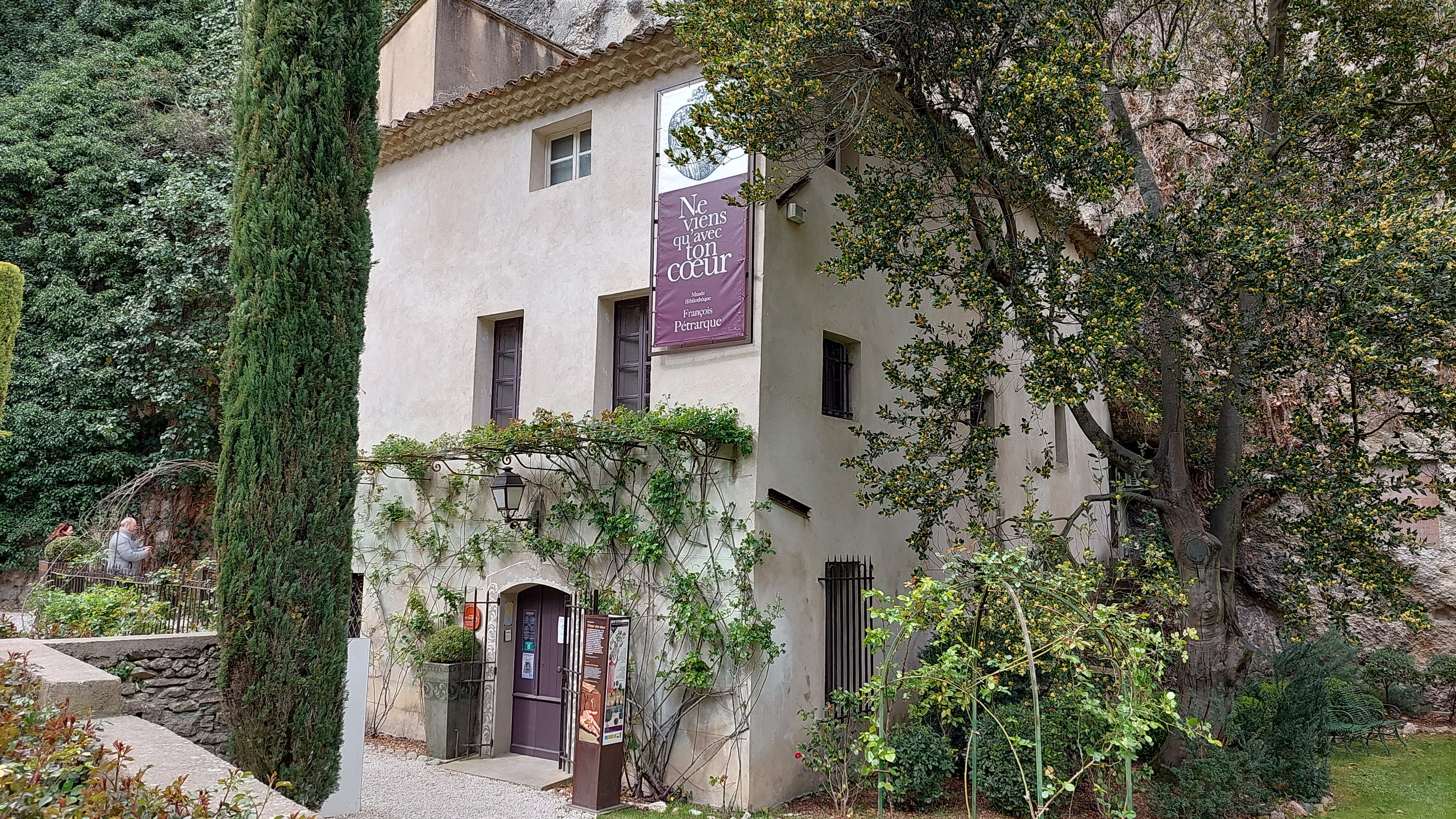
Museum and library dedicated to the Italian poet Francesco Petrarca
