= Paul Tarascon =

Paul Albert Pierre Tarascon
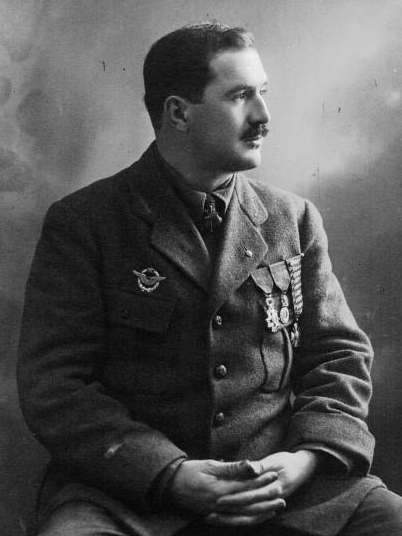
- Paul Tarascon in 1917
- Born: 8 December 1882; Le Thor, France
- Died: 11 June 1977 (aged 94)
- Military career
- Branch: Infantry; aviation
- Rank: Lieutenant (later Colonel)
- Nickname: "l'as à la jambe de bois" (the ace with the wooden leg)
- Units: Escadrille 31; Escadrille 3 Escadrille 62
- Awards: Légion d'honneur Médaille militaire Croix de Guerre
- Other work: Active in French Resistance during World War II

Colonel Paul Albert Pierre Tarascon (8 December 1882 – 11 June 1977) was a World War I flying ace. Despite the handicap of an amputated foot, he was credited with twelve confirmed and ten probable victories in aerial combat. He also served in World War II.

== Pre-World War I ==
Paul Albert Pierre Tarascon was born in Le Thor, France on 8 December 1882.

Tarascon joined the French military in 1901; upon his release from active duty, he was assigned to the 4e Regiment d'Infanterie Coloniale. He became interested in aviation after his release, and decided to learn to fly. In 1911, while learning to fly, he crashed so badly that his right foot had to be amputated. This would spark his later nickname: l'as la jambe de bois (the ace with the wooden leg).

== World War I ==
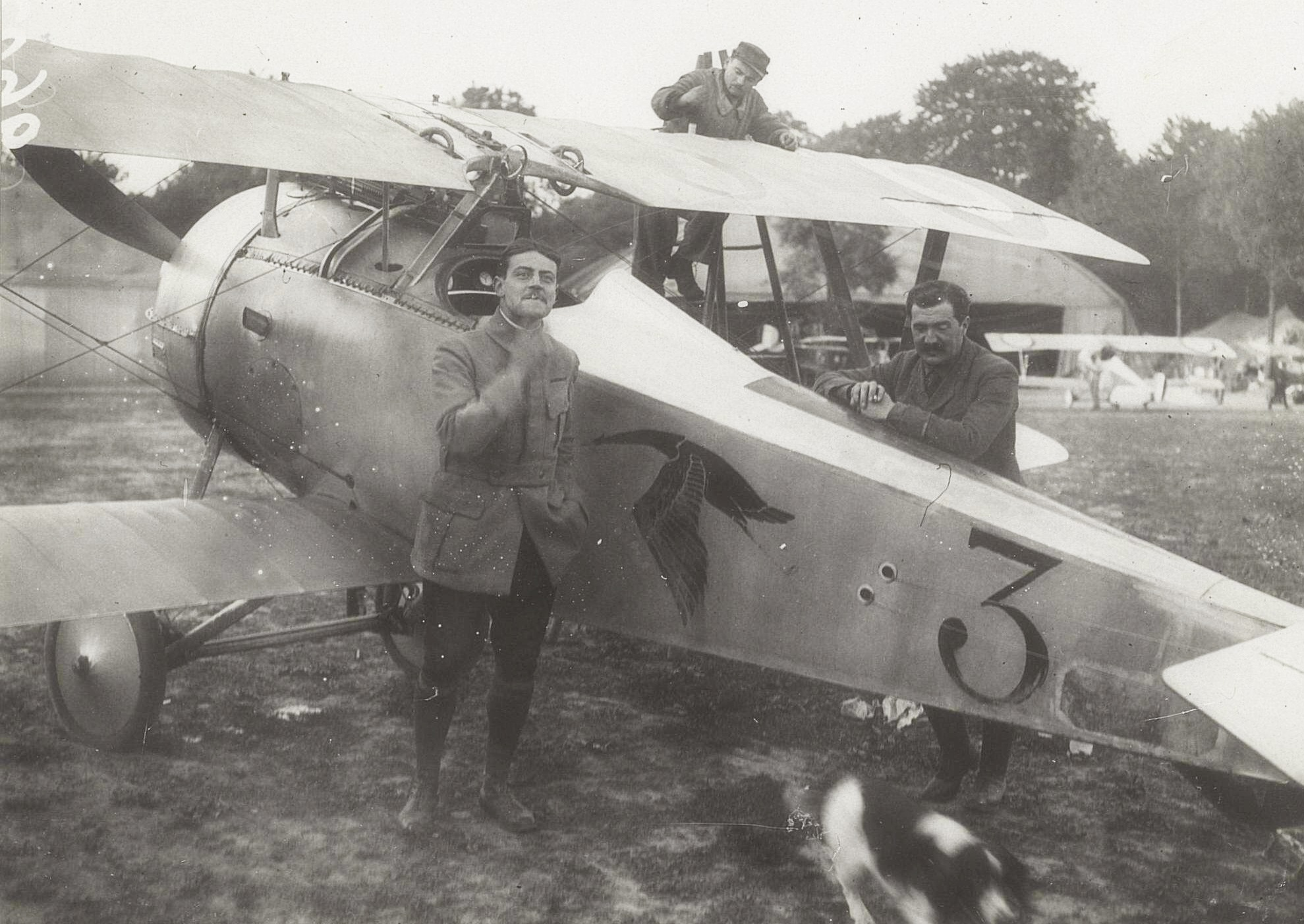
Nieuport 23 with Paul Tarascon at right and squadronmate Albert Deullin at left. Taken 30 September 1916 at Cachy.

Despite his handicap, when World War I began, he volunteered as an aviator and was accepted. He completed military training, receiving Military Pilot's Brevet No. 1741 on 14 December 1914, and became an instructor in January 1915. He requested a combat assignment, and was sent to Escadrille 31 on 6 October 1915, to Escadrille 3 on 1 May 1916, and shortly thereafter to Escadrille 62.

Flying a Nieuport fighter, he scored his first win on 15 July 1916. By 17 November, he had run his total to eight victories in Nieuports. Before he resumed scoring on 6 April 1917, he had changed planes to a Spad. He scored twice more in mid-1917, then one final time on 15 July 1918. Tarascon's personal insignia of a black fighting cock had become adopted by his squadron.

== Later life ==
Tarascon survived the war, and rose to the rank of colonel. He fought in the French Resistance during World War II.

Paul Albert Pierre Tarascon died on 11 June 1977.

== Honors and awards ==
In 1955, Tarascon was elevated to recipient of the Grand Croix de la Légion d'honneur. He had originally been selected for the Légion d'honneur during World War I.

His Chevalier de la Légion d'honneur citation of 15 November 1916 reads:

Adjudant pilot of Escadrille N62. Remarkable pilot by his devotion, skill, coolness and initiative. He has distinguished himself for over a year during the course of numerous reconnaissances, protections and pursuits. On 9 August 1916, his plane was hit over 100 times by enemy bullets. Since the first of July, he has had 35 combats, downing five enemy planes and has forced two others to land in a damaged condition.

His Médaille militaire citation of 4 August 1916 states:

Adjudant pilot of Escadrille N62. Excellent pilot, always prepared to work. Although one leg had been amputated, he entered aviation and has carried out numerous reconnaissances over long distances and has had 15 aerial combats. On 15 July 1916, he downed an Aviatik de chasse, which fell in flames in enemy territory."

Tarascon also won the Croix de Guerre with twelve palmes during World War I.
