= Marcel Bloch =

Marcel Bloch may refer to:

- Marcel Dassault (né Bloch, 1892–1986), French aircraft industrialist
- Marcel Bloch (aviator) (1890–1938), French World War I flying ace
