= Jewish cemetery, L'Isle-sur-la-Sorgue =

Historic cemetery in Vaucluse, Provence, France

Coordinates: 43°54′41″N 5°01′34″E

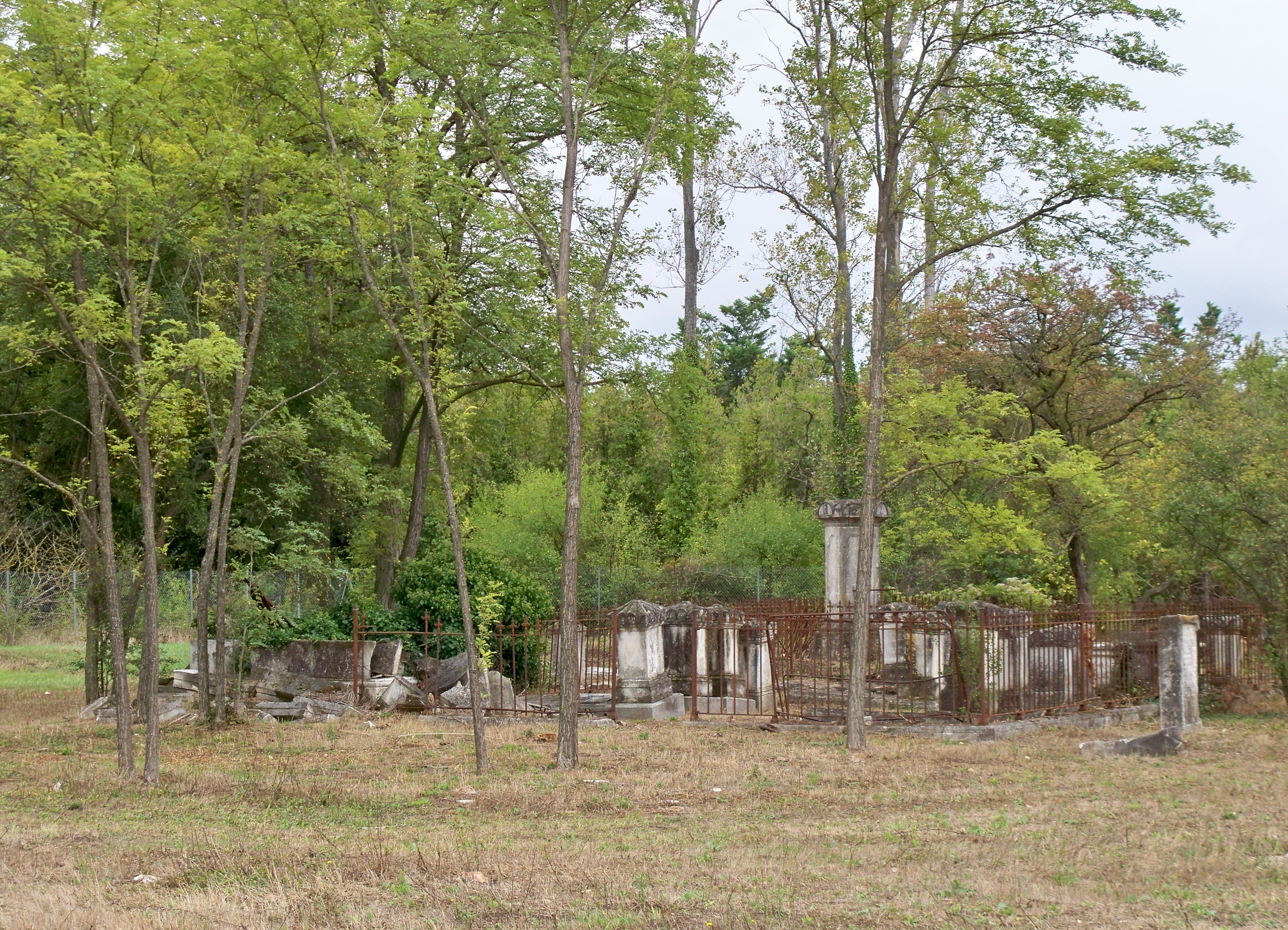
The cemetery

The Jewish cemetery of L'Isle-sur-la-Sorgue (French: Cimetière juif de L'Isle-sur-la-Sorgue) is one of the important Jewish sites of the Department of Vaucluse in Provence, France. Since 30 June 2008 it is listed as a historic monument.

== Comtadines Jews ==
The Jewish community is present in Comtat Venaissin since the Middle Ages. Several comtadines cities, like Bollene, Le Thor, Carpentras, Malaucène, welcomed the Jewish population, effective in 1322, the date on which Pope John XXII expelled the Jews from the Comtat.

== L'Isle-sur-la-Sorgue Jews ==
Installed near the current place of Jewry, the community had several buildings around the synagogue. It was destroyed in 1856. The "Carrière" (from the Provençal "carriero", street) was established around an impasse, in an area of 2,500 m^{2}. Around 28 families lived in this place in 1682, 63 families in 1789.

== Cemetery ==
It is initially near the Carrière but its movement was dictated by the expansion of the city. A new location was found south of the town, then increased in 1736 by the purchase of land adjacent Jean-Jacques Guérin, for 650 livres tournois.

This site is the only Jewish cemetery of the city, listed on the inventory made in 1906, following the law of separation of church and state in 1905. If the property is communal usufruct is preserved until 1939, the last year of burial. Portal provides access to land 9460 m^{2}, enclosed by a fence. Currently, there are about forty graves in this cemetery, of those buried in the last century of use in pens of four families that remained: the Abram, Carcassonne, Cremieux, the Créange. Among the people buried in this cemetery is a former mayor of L'Isle-sur-la-Sorgue, Abram Adolphe Michel (1834–1905), mayor from 1871 to 1874.

By order of 30 June 2008 listing under the historical monuments of the ancient Jewish cemetery in whole with its portal tombs, monuments and other items, its soil and subsoil (cadastre BP 97).

In 2013, the cemetery and other historical monuments of the Jewish community were included in an application for UNESCO World Heritage Site recognition.
