= Notre-Dame-du-Lac =

Notre-Dame-du-Lac may refer to:

- Notre-Dame-du-Lac, Quebec, a former city that is now part of Témiscouata-sur-le-Lac
- Notre-Dame-du-Lac Church in Le Thor, Vaucluse, France
- Abbey of Notre-Dame du Lac (Oka, Quebec) in Oka, Quebec
- University of Notre Dame du Lac, usually known as Notre Dame, Indiana, United States
