= Fontaine de Vaucluse (spring) =

Karst spring in France

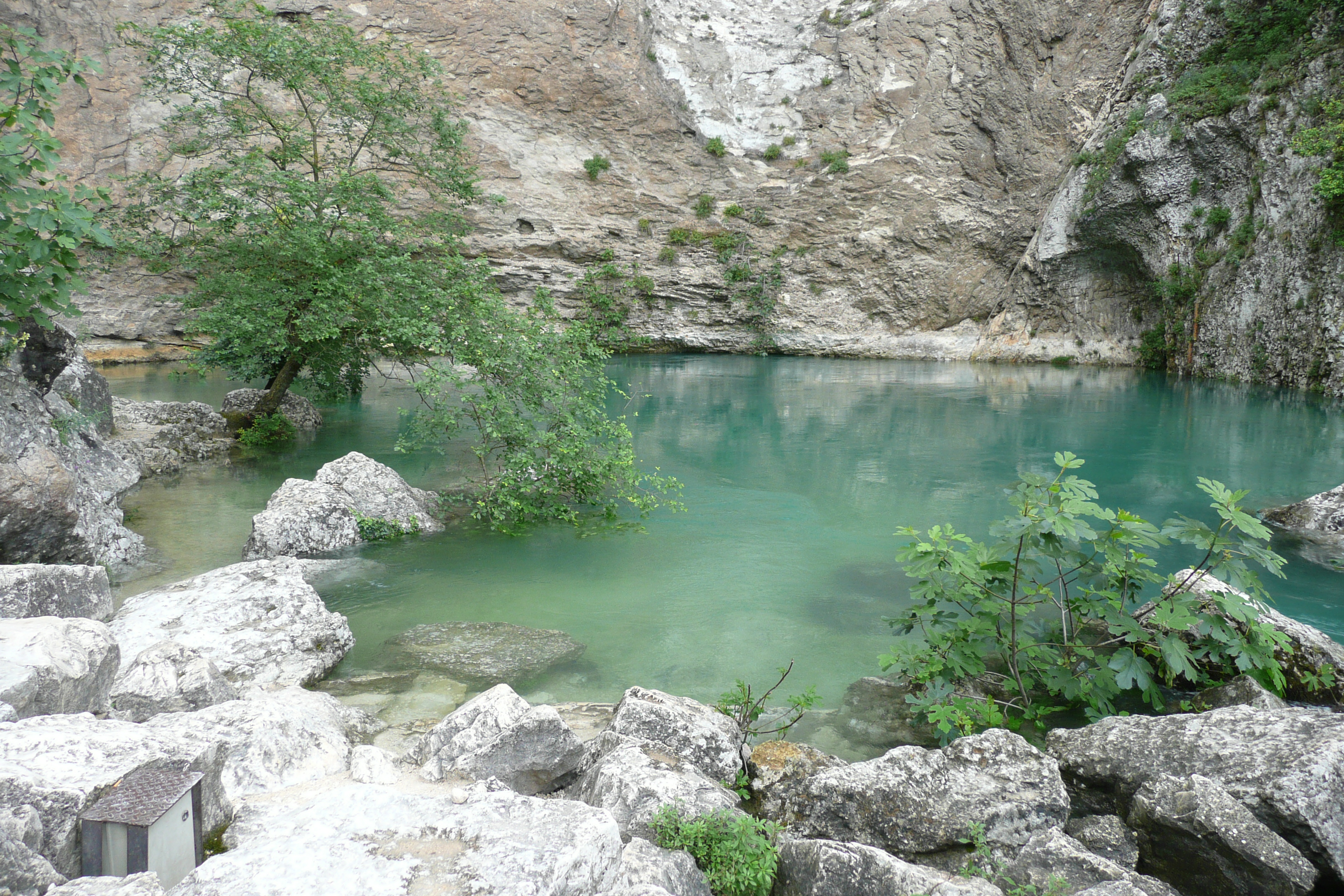
- The spring in May 2008, at high water level

- Location within France
- Location: Fontaine-de-Vaucluse, France
- Coordinates: 43.917924°N 5.132897°E
- Elevation: 105 m (344 ft)
- Type: karst spring

The Fontaine de Vaucluse (French pronunciation: [fɔ̃tɛn də voklyz]; Occitan: Fònt de Vaucluse) is a karst spring in the commune of Fontaine-de-Vaucluse, France. It is the largest karst spring in metropolitan France by flow and fifth largest in the world, with an annual output of 630,000,000 to 700,000,000 cubic metres (2.2×10^{10} to 2.5×10^{10} cu ft) of water. The spring is the prime example in hydrogeology of a "Vaucluse spring". It is the source of the Sorgue.

== Geography ==
=== Location ===
The Fontaine de Vaucluse is in the commune of Fontaine-de-Vaucluse in the department of Vaucluse. The commune was formerly called "Vaucluse", but being in a department with the same name caused confusion, so the commune was renamed "Fontaine-de-Vaucluse", after the spring.

=== Origin of the name ===
The village in which the spring is located was called "Vallis Clausa" ("closed valley") in Latin because of its topographical position. This in time became "Vaucluse", from which the spring takes its name. The name in the Provençal dialect is "Fònt de Vauclusa", the spring of the closed valley. The word font has two meanings in Provençal, "fountain" and "spring". Here it designates a spring and not a fountain.

=== Geology ===
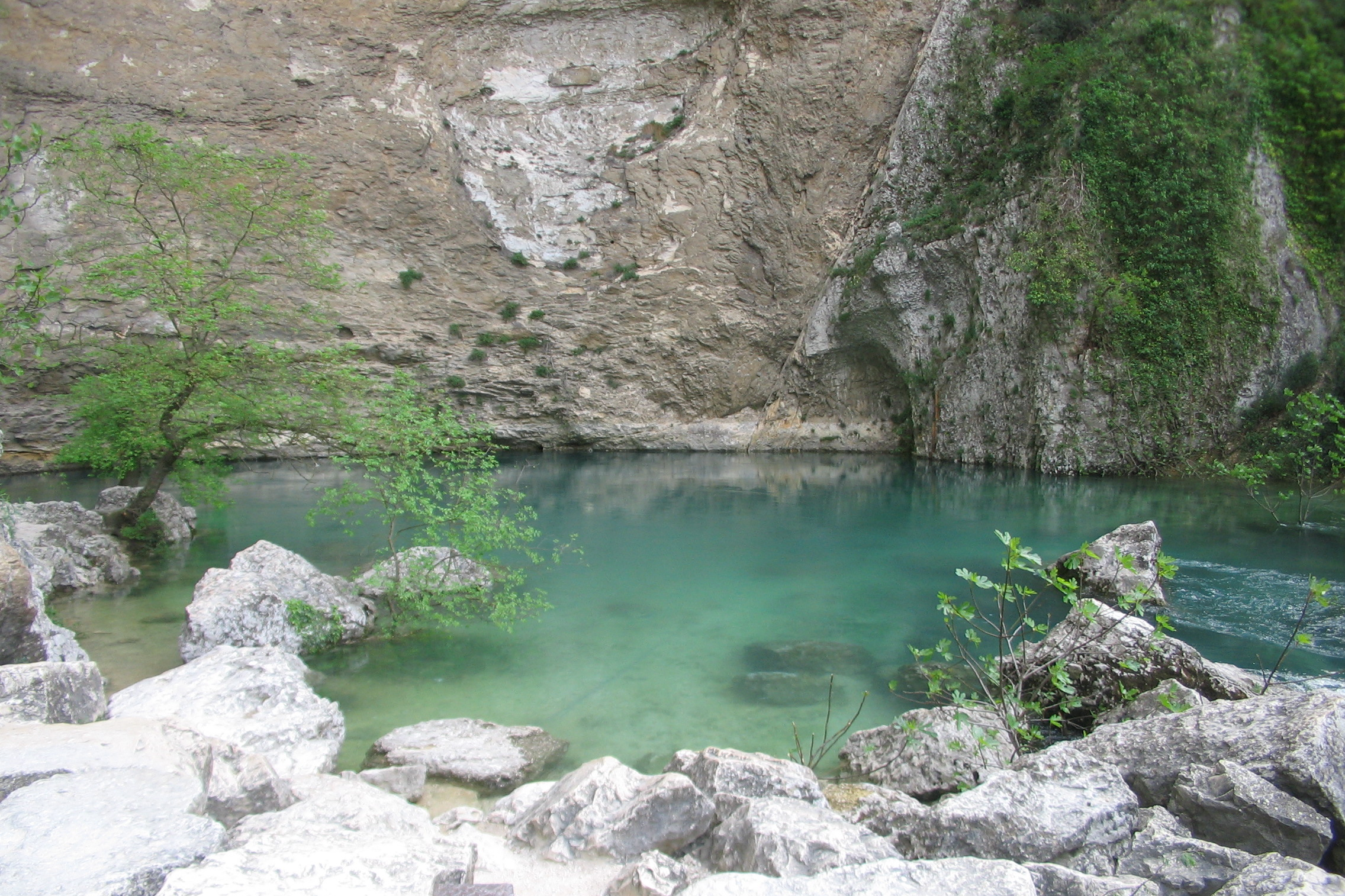
The Fontaine de Vaucluse, in April 2008

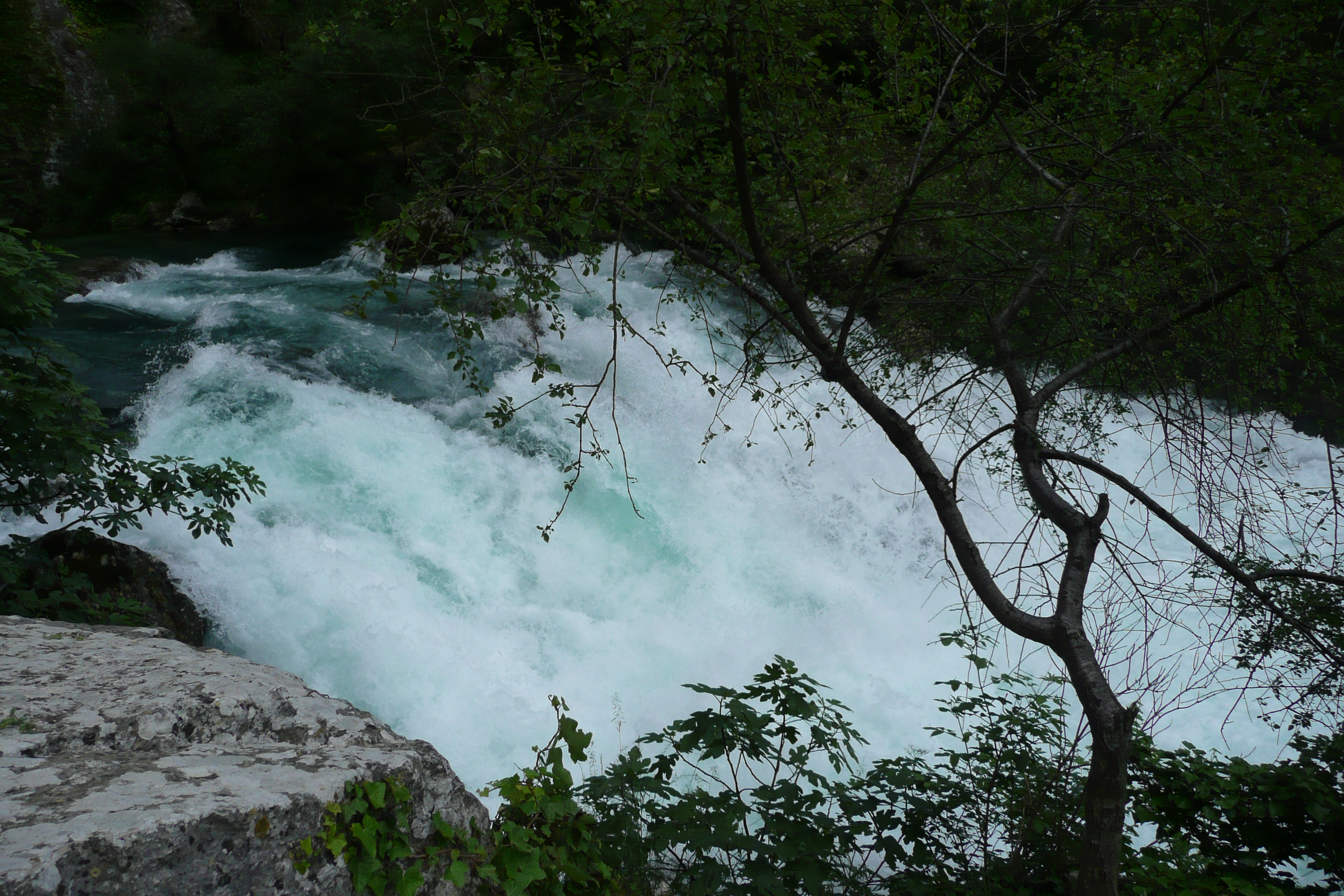
Same place, on 31 May 2008, during an overflow of 1.53 metres (5 ft)

The Fontaine de Vaucluse was formed after the Messinian salinity crisis, during the latter part of the Messinian age of the Miocene epoch, from 5.96 to 5.33 Ma (million years ago), which caused the depth of the exsurgence.

Above the spring there is a 230-metre (750 ft)-high limestone cliff with innumerable breaks and faults. This acts as a reservoir, a karst aquifer, in which the water circulates along the discontinuities until it meets a barrier of limestone and clay.

The spring, which feeds the River Sorgue, is the only exit point of a 1,100-square-kilometre (420 sq mi) underground basin, which captures waters from Mont Ventoux, the Vaucluse Mountains, the Albion Plateau^{(fr)} and the Lure Mountain^{(fr)}. The water of this exsurgence contains an average of 200 milligrams per litre (7.2×10^{−6} lb/cu in) of calcium carbonate, and has an annual flow of about 700,000,000 cubic metres (2.5×10^{10} cu ft), so the reservoir loses 50,000 cubic metres (1,800,000 cu ft) of limestone each year.

This karstification phenomenon acting on the surface of the impluvium, removes an annual volume of 45 cubic metres (1,600 cu ft) per square kilometre, which disappears after being dissolved in the water. That figure becomes more meaningful when calculations show that, in 3.5 million years, the Vaucluse Mountains, the Albion Plateau, and the Lure Mountain, will have had their thickness reduced by 1,500 metres (4,900 ft).

== History ==
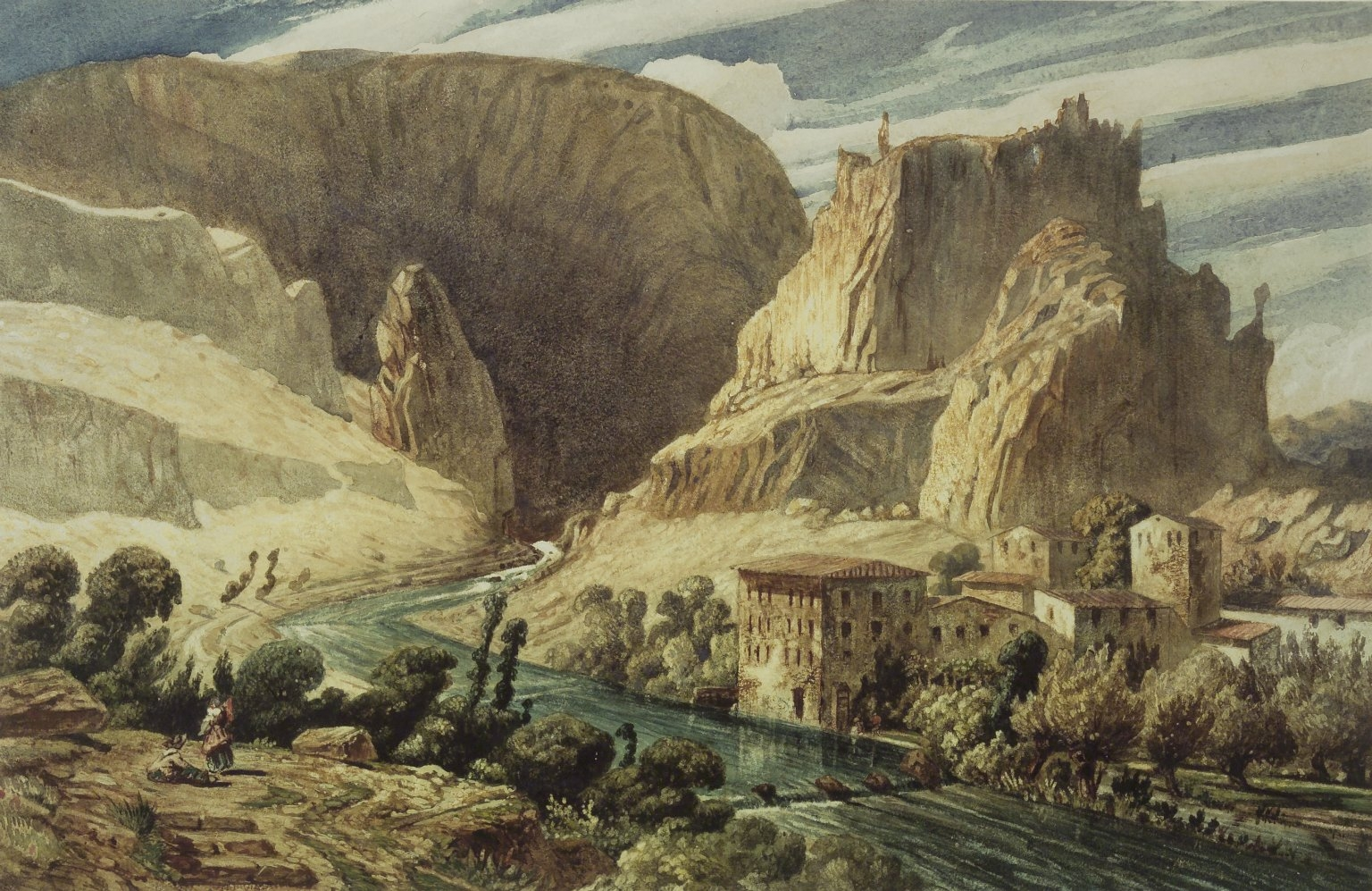
Fontaine de Vaucluse, by Paul Huet, c. 1839

In antiquity the site was a place of ritual offerings. During various dives, particularly in 1998, the members of the Fontaine-de-Vaucluse Speleological Society (SSFV), were intrigued by the presence of many coins. Prospecting dives were made by SSFV speleologists under the direction of the Department of Underwater and Underwater Archaeological Research (DRASSM^{fr}). The Spélénaute submarine allowed them to work between −40 and −80 metres (−130 and −260 ft) in 2001, revealing ancient deposits of currency. A year later, during a new exploration campaign, speleologists retrieved 400 pieces of great historical value. In 2003 a new archaeological site allowed other discoveries. 1,600 pieces and objects have been recovered, dating from the 1st century BC to the middle of the 5th century AD.

== Legend ==
=== Legend of the Coulobre ===
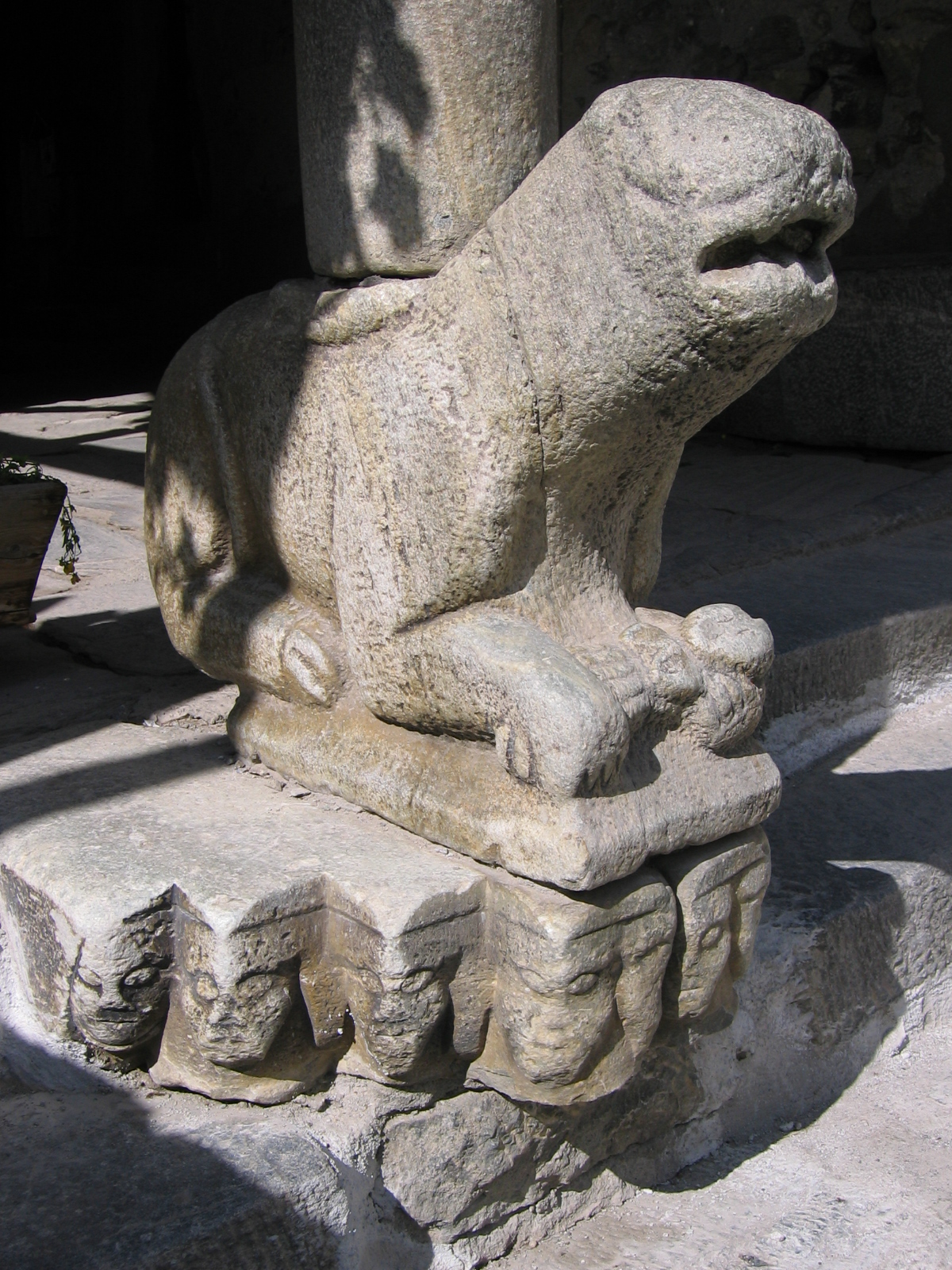
The Coulobre, statue at the door of the church of Saint-Véran

Fontaine de Vaucluse inspired many geomyths.

A legend tells that Saint Veranus, bishop of Cavaillon, rid the Sorgue of a horrible Drac, a devil or dragon, the Coulobre^{(fr)}. The Coulobre, whose name could be derived from the Latin word coluber (snake), was a winged creature who lived in the Fontaine de Vaucluse. According to legend, she coupled with dragons who then abandoned her, forcing her to raise on her own the small black salamanders to which she gave birth. She was desperate for a new husband and a father for her children but her ugliness repulsed all suitors.

According to Albert Dauzat and Charles Rostaing, the Drac is a Ligurian divinity of tumultuous waters and the Coulobre owes its name to two Celto-Ligurian^{(fr)} roots: Kal (stone) and Briga (hill). This is the cliff overlooking the spring which still holds the Vache d'Or, the site of an ancient pastoral religion celebrating the strength and form of water and stone.

On the trail, we can see the Traou dou Couloubre, symbol of the fight of Saint Veranus against the ancient religions.

=== Legend of the nymph ===
This legend recounts the story of a minstrel, Basil, who fell asleep on the way to the spring and saw a nymph appear. She led him to the edge of the spring, which opened to let them descend to a meadow strewn with supernatural flowers. The nymph showed seven diamonds to the minstrel. By lifting one of them, she made a powerful jet of water gush out. "Here," she said, "is the secret of the spring of which I am the guardian. To make it swell I remove the diamonds. With the seventh the water reaches the fig tree, which drinks only once a year." She disappeared while waking Basil.

== Exploration and study ==
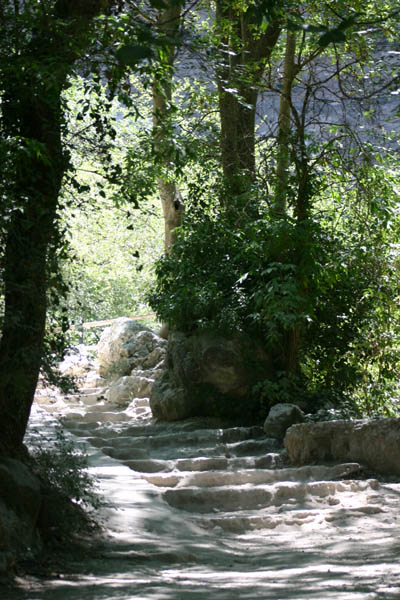
Path leading to the spring

The first dive in heavy diving gear took place in 1879 when Nello Ottonelli ventured down to 23 metres (75 ft). Dr. Henri Louis Joseph Ayme^{(fr)} organized exploration of the basin and on 24 September 1938 Negri reached a depth of 27.5 metres (90 ft). It was then necessary to wait for the arrival of the scuba diving suit in 1946 when Jacques Cousteau reached 46 metres (151 ft), then 74 metres (243 ft) nine years later. This is the limit of dives with air. In 1981 Claude Touloumdjian reached 153 metres (502 ft) with an oxygen-helium mixture. Finally, in 1983, Jochen Hasenmayer reached 205 metres (673 ft). To go even deeper and touch the bottom it would be necessary to use robots.

In 1985 the Modexa 350 Mission removed the mystery about the depth of the system. The robot touched bottom at a depth of 305 metres (1,001 ft). In 1989 another robot, Spélénaute (SSFV), reached the lowest point known to date in the siphon at a depth of 308 metres (1,010 ft). In 1997 the diver Pascal Bernabé descended to a depth of 250 metres (820 ft). In 2014 a virtual tour was created by the photographer Christoph Gerigk in collaboration with the Speleological Society of Fontaine de Vaucluse (SSFV) from 360° spherical panoramic views.

Today, the joint efforts of geologists, hydrogeologists, hydrochemists and speleologists have made it possible to gain a better understanding of the functioning of this karst spring. Its catchment receives waters from Mont Ventoux, the Vaucluse Mountains, the Albion Plateau and Lure Mountain, but it excludes Bluye Mountain in the north, as well as the Luberon massif and the Apt syncline in the south.

The part of the reservoir that is accessible to speleologists exceeds a depth of −921 metres (−3,022 ft), (Note: −921 metres (−3,022 ft): In speleology, negative and positive measurements are defined with respect to a reference point which is the entry of the network.) since it has been explored during a period of low water from several open cavities forming the karst system of the Souffleur hole of Saint-Christol, the "underground river of Albion". This system of chasms and cavities, which riddles the Albion Plateau, is one of the effects of karstification. During heavy storms, it can store around 110,000,000 cubic metres (3.9×10^{9} cu ft). A mathematical model indicated that, based on the greatest depth of −308 metres (−1,010 ft) and the surface area of the catchment, permanent reserves could reach 150,000,000 cubic metres (5.3×10^{9} cu ft).

Over the course of a decade, the annual flow varies between 630,000,000 and 700,000,000 cubic metres (2.2×10^{10} and 2.5×10^{10} cu ft). With an average of 21 cubic metres (740 cu ft) per second, it yields seven times more than all the drinking water distributed in the department of Vaucluse. It is the largest spring in France by volume of water released, and ranks fifth among the world's largest springs.

== Access ==
Since March 2024 the final stretch of the path to the spring has been closed for an indefinite period by the department of Vaucluse and the commune, because of a severe risk of falling rocks from the cliff above; a 2023 study had found numerous instabilities in the cliff. The public viewing point is now about 50 metres (160 ft) before the chasm.

== Sources ==
- Audra, Philippe; Mocochain, Ludovic; Bigot, Jean-Yves (2009), "Spéléogenèse per ascensum par remontée du niveau de base. Interprétation des réseaux ennoyés, dénoyés, des sources vauclusiennes et des puits-cheminées", Karstologia Mémoires (in French), Paris: Association française de karstologie, ISBN 978-2-9515952-0-0
- Audra, Philippe; Mocochain, Ludovic; Camu, Hubert; Gilli, Éric; Clauzon, Georges; Bigot, Jean-yves (2004), The effect of the Messinian Deep Stage on karst development around the Mediterranean Sea. Examples from Southern France (PDF)
- Bayle, Bernard; Graillot, Didier (January 1987), "Fontaine de Vaucluse: Compte-rendu hydrogéologique de l'opération Spélénaute du 2 août 1985", Karstologia: Revue de Karstologie et de Spéléologie Physique (in French), Paris: Association française de karstologie, pp. 1–6, ISBN 978-2-95-042225-5
- Bernabé, Pascal (1998), "-250 mètres à Fontaine de Vaucluse", Octopus (in French) (11)
- Brasey, Édouard (14 September 2007), La Petite Encyclopédie du merveilleux (in French), Paris: Éditions Le Pré aux clercs, ISBN 978-2842283216
- Caton, Pascal (2015), "Découverte de l'aven des Neiges:nouvelle entrée du trou Souffleur (Sain-Christol-d'Albion, Vaucluse)" (PDF), Site du Groupe Spéléo Bagnols Marcoule (GSBM), extrait de Spelunca n°137, 2015
- "Communes > Fontaine-de-Vaucluse", Site officiel de l'Office de Tourisme Intercommunal du Pays des Sorgues et des Monts de Vaucluse (in French), archived from the original on 2011-09-01
- Courbon, Paul; Parein, René (May 1991), Atlas souterrain de la Provence et des Alpes de Lumière. Cavités supérieures à 100 m de profondeur ou 1000 m de développement des départements suivants: Alpes de Haute-Provence, Hautes-Alpes, Alpes Maritimes, Bouches-du-Rhône, Var, Vaucluse (PDF) (in French) (3 ed.), La Ravoire: GAP, p. 216, ISBN 2-7417-0007-9
- Dauzat, Albert; Rostaing, Charles (1968), Dictionnaire étymologique des noms de lieux en France (in French), Larousse
- "Fontaine de Vaucluse France - Fontaine de Vaucluse en Provence", avignon-et-provence.com (in French)
- Gilli, Eric; Mangan, Christian; Mudry, Jacques (2016), Hydrogéologie: Objets, méthodes, applications (PDF) (in French), Paris: Dunod, ISBN 9782100753352, archived from the original (pdf) on 23 August 2017
- Michelot, Claude; Mudry, Jacques (1985), "Remarques sur les exutoires de l'aquifère karstique de la Fontaine de Vaucluse", revue Karstologia, 6: 11–14
- Nicod, Jean (1991), "Du nouveau sur la Fontaine de Vaucluse et son karst", Annales de géographie (in French), 100 (559): 333–339
- Pastor, Roland, "Fontaine de Vaucluse", plongeesout.com (in French)
- Sausse, Olivier (2013), "Ouverture de l'aven Aubert: nouvelle entrée du trou Souffleur (Saint-Christol-d'Albion, Vaucluse)" (PDF), Site du Groupe Spéléo Bagnols Marcoule (GSBM), extrait de Spelunca n°130, 2013 (in French)
- Truc, Georges (1991), L'eau en Vaucluse. Origine, fonctionnement, potentiel et qualité des réservoirs aquifères (in French), Avignon: Éd. Conseil Général de Vaucluse
- "Visite virtuelle du gouffre", ssfv.fr (in French), Société Spéléologique de Fontaine de Vaucluse, archived from the original on 5 May 2023
