= Jean-Paul Favre de Thierrens =

French flying ace

- Born: Jean-Paul Jacques Favre de Thierrens; 18 February 1895; Nîmes, France
- Died: 17 October 1973 (aged 78); Paris, France
- Military career
- Allegiance: France
- Branch: Aviation
- Rank: lieutenant colonel
- Units: 32nd Regiment d'Artillerie, Escadrille 215, Escadrille 62
- Awards: Légion d'honneur, Croix de Guerre
- Other work: mole for the French Resistance

Jean-Paul Jacques Favre de Thierrens (18 February 1895 – 17 October 1973) was a World War I flying ace credited with five confirmed aerial victories and one unconfirmed one. His courageous service would earn him the Légion d'honneur and the Croix de guerre.

He would return to service during World War II, becoming active in espionage for the French Resistance while rising to the military rank of lieutenant colonel. His status in the Legion d'honneur was raised to Commander as a result of his continued service to his nation.

== Early life ==
Favre de Thierrens was born in Nîmes, France, on 18 February 1895. He was raised in a Calvinist family. He passed the exam to enter at the Ecole des Beaux-arts. He did not spend much time at the Beaux-arts as the first World War broke out.

== Aviation service during World War I ==
His initial military service during World War I was in the 32nd Regiment d'Artillerie. After transfer to the Aéronautique Militaire, Favre de Thierrens underwent aviation training and received his Military Pilot's Brevet in 1916. He was posted to Escadrille F215, which was equipped with Farmans. He was wounded by antiaircraft shrapnel on 2 September 1916. After winning two citations with Escadrille 215, he was transferred to Escadrille N62 as a Nieuport pilot. After the unit re-equipped with SPAD VIIs, he began to score aerial victories. He would have five victory claims verified as scored between 21 October 1917 and 4 June 1918; in later years, he would claim a sixth win that apparently was not officially verified.

On 12 June 1918, he was appointed a Chevalier in the Legion d'honneur. The accompanying award proclamation mentioned that he had amassed four citations. At some point, he had also been awarded the Croix de Guerre.

== List of aerial victories ==
See also Aerial victory standards of World War I

Confirmed victories are numbered and listed chronologically. Unconfirmed victories are denoted by "u/c".

No.	Date/time	Aircraft	Foe	Result	Location	Notes
1	21 October 1917	Spad VII	Albatros two-seater	Destroyed	Chavignon, France	
2	6 December 1917	Spad VII	Fokker Triplane	Destroyed	Colligis-Crandelain, France	
3	15 May 1918	Spad VII	LVG two-seater	Destroyed	Monampteuil, France	
4	25 May 1918	Spad VII	Enemy aircraft	Destroyed	Ambrief, France	
u/c	31 May 1918	Spad VII	Enemy two-seater	Destroyed		No official record of confirmation
5	4 June 1918	Spad VII	Albatros D.V	Destroyed	Aisne River, Soissons, France	Victory shared with André Louis Bosson

== World War II ==
Favre de Thierrens would return to service, rising to lieutenant colonel during World War II. He would join the Vichy regime's prisoner of war aid society, the Rassemblement national prisonniers de guerre, as a mole on behalf of the French Resistance; he was involved in the escape of General Henri Giraud. He was the immediate superior of François Mitterrand. Later, on 12 September 1994, François Mitterrand in a television interview about his Vichyst past, talked about Favre de Thierrens as a colourful character. When the zone libre or free zone was invaded, he hide in his house at Ledenon, Gard the archives of the French secret services. His services would earn him a promotion to Commander in the Legion d'honneur, the award being made on 2 November 1945.

== After World War II ==
After World War II, he moved back to his estate at Saint-Bonnet-du-Gard.

In 1953, at the age of 59 years, Favre de Thierrens started to paint and became a fine artist noted for figure studies. His first exhibition took place in 1955, followed by others in Switzerland and the US. He mainly painted women but not also his estate and the countryside of Provence.

In 1971, as he became blinded, he stopped painting.

Jean-Paul Jacques Favre de Thierrens died on 17 October 1973 in Paris. He is buried in Nîmes.
