= Hôtel de Ville, L'Isle-sur-la-Sorgue =

Town hall in L'Isle-sur-la-Sorgue, France

Hôtel de Ville
- The main frontage of the Hôtel de Ville in August 2026

General information
- Type: City hall
- Architectural style: Neoclassical style
- Location: L'Isle-sur-la-Sorgue, France
- Coordinates: 43.9195°N 5.0506°E
- Completed: 1839

Design and construction
- Architect: Jean-Jacques Delpuech

The Hôtel de Ville (French pronunciation: [otɛl də vil], City Hall) is a municipal building in L'Isle-sur-la-Sorgue, Vaucluse, in southeastern France, standing on Rue Carnot.

== History ==
The building was erected on the site of an old Romanesque tower with a vaulted ceiling which was incorporated into later structures on the site. This was followed by the Maison Communale, an early form of municipal building, which erected there in the 14th century. The consuls met in the building to discuss municipal affairs under the ancien regime.

In July 1793, during the French Revolution, troops of the National Convention, led by François Amédée Doppet of the "Légion des Allobroges" attacked the town and the town hall was pillaged although it was physically undamaged. During the subsequent Reign of Terror, from September 1793 to July 1794, the building served as a prison for the incarceration and repression of local people: 1,223 local people were arrested and imprisoned.

After the revolution, the building was restored to municipal use but had become very dilapidated. In 1820, the council voted in favour of refurbishment and enlargement of the building but did not have the funds with which to undertake it. It was not until 1839, that the council led by the mayor, Alexandre Joseph Courtet, allowed an extensive restoration project to proceed. The work was undertaken to a design by the municipal architect, Jean-Jacques Delpuech.

The design involved an asymmetrical main frontage of seven bays facing onto what is now Rue Carnot. The fourth bay from the left featured a doorway which was flanked by paired Doric order columns supporting an entablature inscribed with the words "Hôtel de Ville". The rest of the main frontage was fenestrated by casement windows with moulded surrounds on three floors and, at roof level, there was a cornice. There were also quoins at the corners of the building. Internally, the principal room was the Salle des Mariages (wedding room).

In September 2019, the council initiated a major programme of works to replace the heating and air conditioning systems in the building at a cost of €129,000.
