= Sorgue =

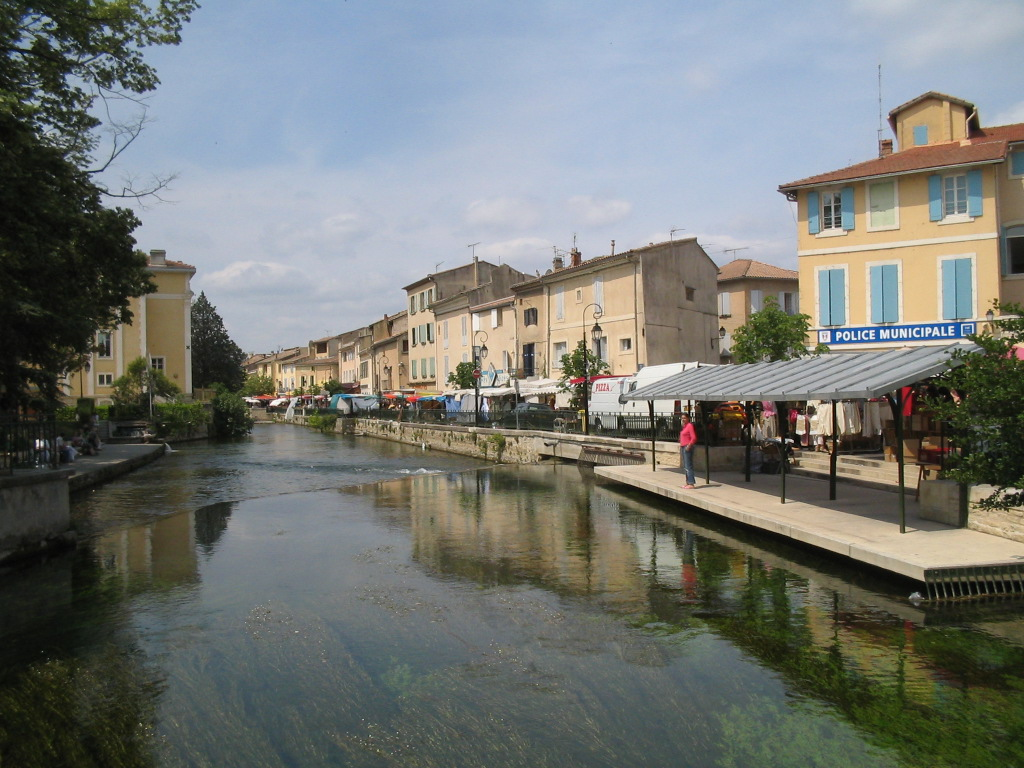
- The town of L'Isle-sur-la-Sorgue, Vaucluse, on the Sorgue.

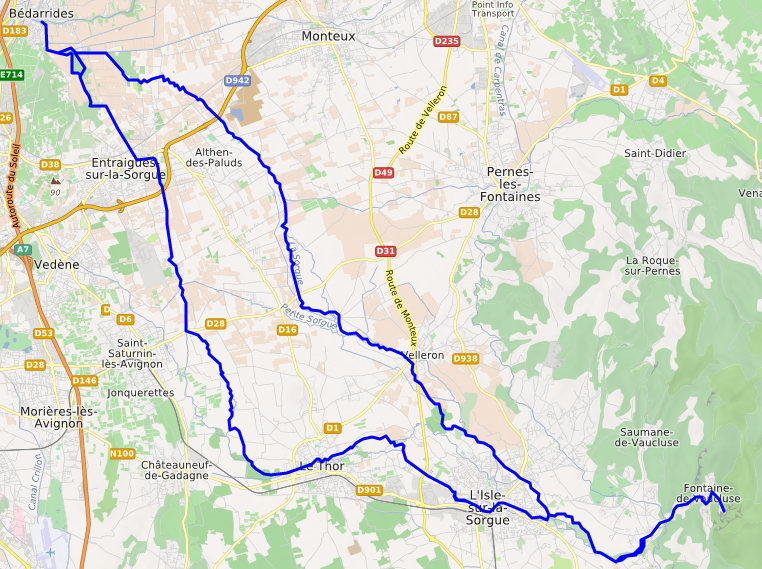

Location
- Country: France

Physical characteristics
- Source
  - location: Fontaine de Vaucluse
  - coordinates: 43.9179°N 5.1327°E
- Mouth: Ouvèze
  - coordinates: 44.0388°N 4.8989°E
- Length: 30 km (19 mi)
- Basin size: 1,230 km^{2} (470 sq mi)
- Discharge
  - average: 18.10 m^{3}/s (639 cu ft/s)

Basin features
- Progression: Ouvèze→ Rhône→ Mediterranean Sea
- Tributaries
  - right: Nesque

The Sorgue is a river in Southeastern France lying between the foothills of the Alps and the Rhône. It is 30.4 km (18 7/8 mi) long. Its source is near the town of Fontaine-de-Vaucluse, Vaucluse department. It is the biggest spring in France and the fifth biggest in the world.

The Sorgue divides into two river courses at L'Isle-sur-la-Sorgue, at a point on the river called the Partage des Eaux, then further downstream it divides into dozens of separate waterways with different names, such as Sorgue de l’Isle, Sorgue de Velleron, Sorgue de Monclar, Sorgue de la Faible.

All these arms of the Sorgue flow along the plain of the Sorgues, between L'Isle-sur-la-Sorgue and Avignon. The two largest streams, the Sorgue of Velleron and the Sorgue d'Entraigues, rejoin with one another and enter the Ouvèze at Bédarrides. The Canal de Vaucluse, which is the third-largest river course, joins with the Ouvèze at Sorgues, and flows into the Rhône at Avignon.

== History ==
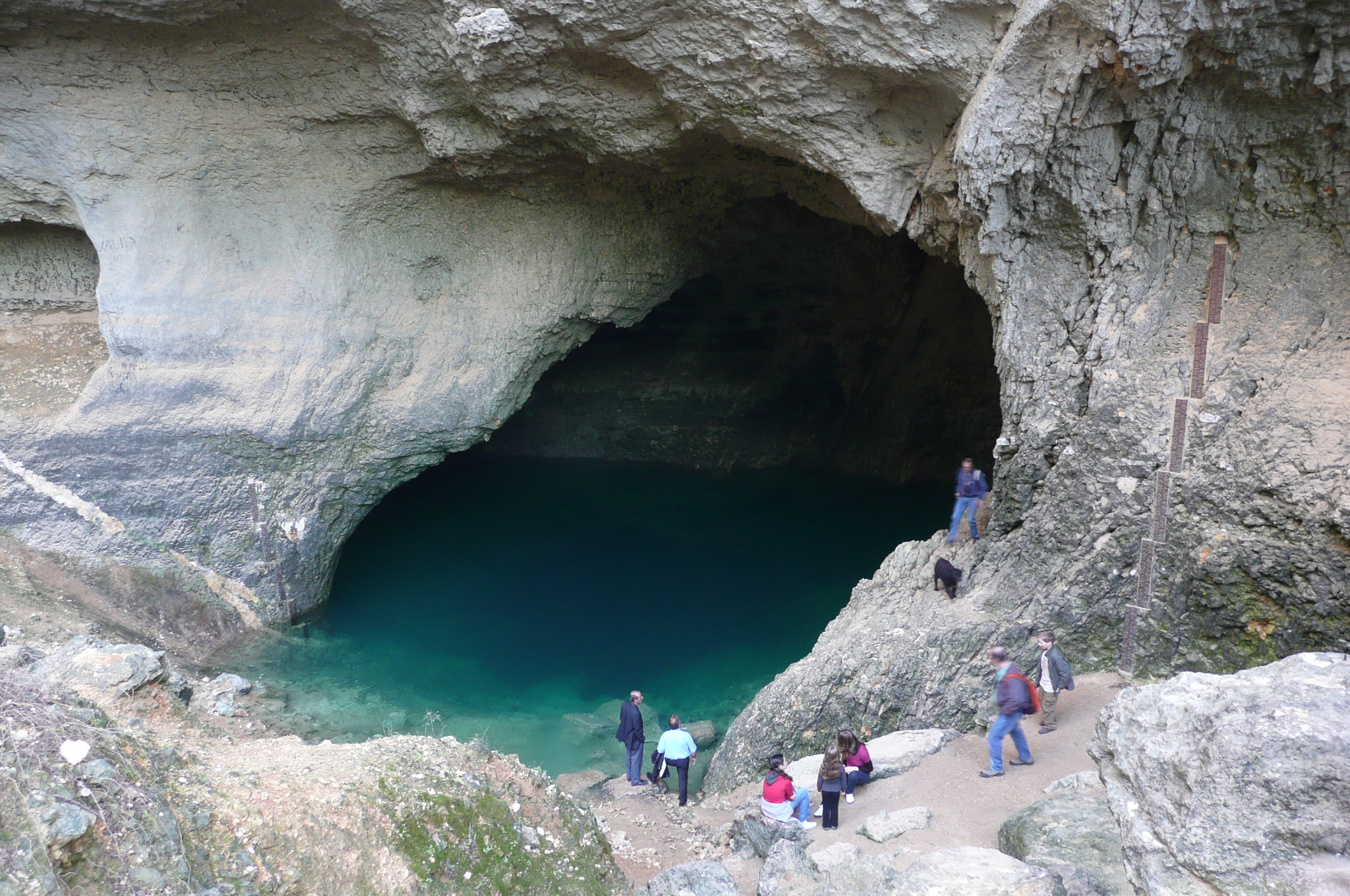
At the source of the river is France's biggest spring (low water level).

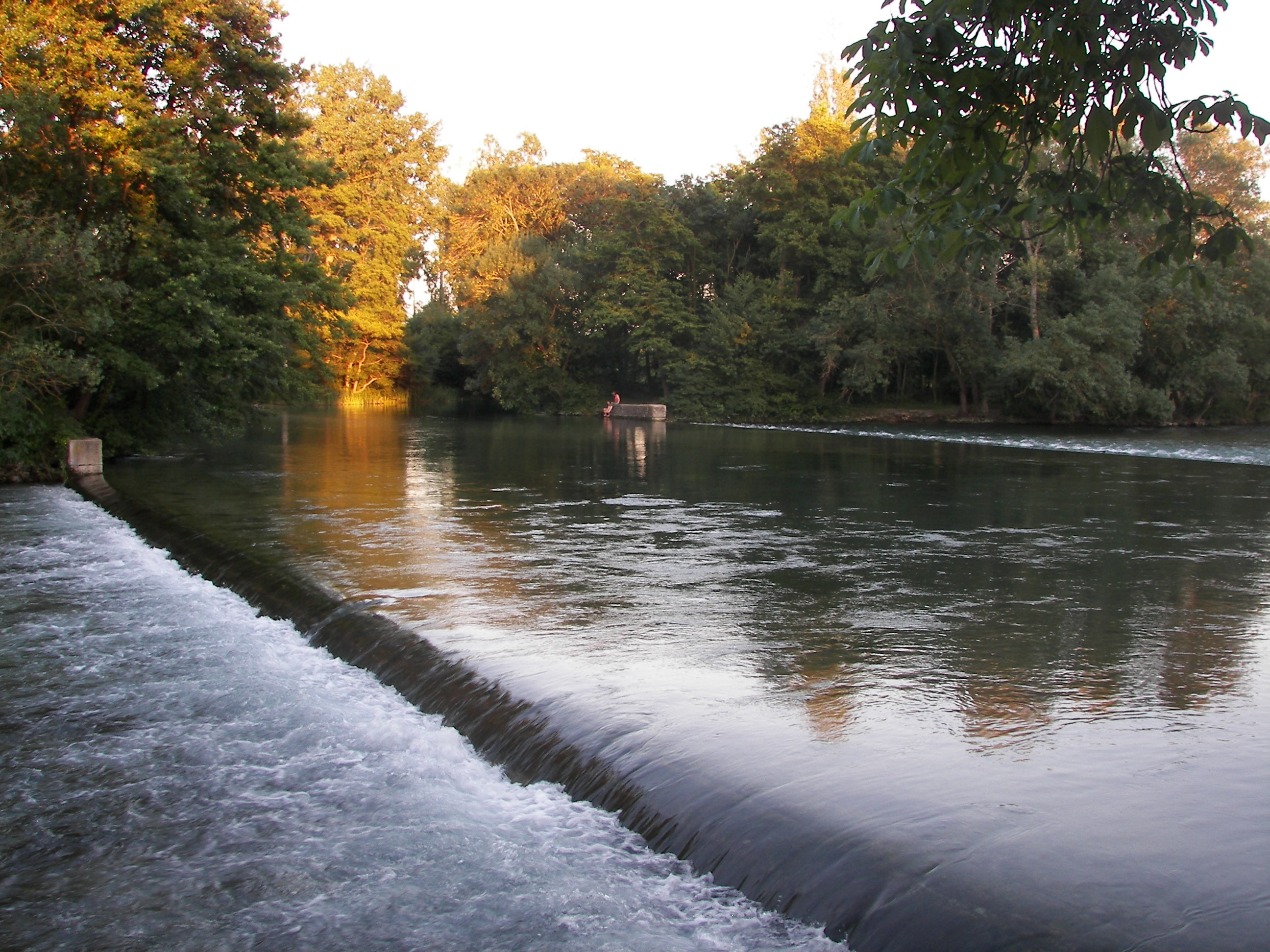
The river Sorgue divides at L'Isle-sur-la-Sorgue, where one of its many weirs can be seen.

In the mid-fourteenth century, the Italian humanist, poet and scholar Petrarch visited the region of Vaucluse, climbing Mont Ventoux in 1336. Notable as the eternal lover of Laura de Noves, Petrarch returned repeatedly to the Fontaine de Vaucluse to listen to the "voice of the waters". The poet expresses his happiness:

"The beautiful source of the river Sorgue, famous in her own right since time immemorial, is celebrated once more by my own extended stay and by my songs." (La très illustre source de la Sorgue, fameuse par elle-même depuis longtemps, est devenue plus célèbre encore par mon long séjour et par mes chants).

== Economy ==
The management and upkeep of the waterways that make up the river Sorgue is not conducted directly by the State. Local towns have delegated the management of the river to three Unions of Local Rivers, which are federated within the Mixed Union of the Pool of the Sorgues.

The Sorgue has historically provided power and water for many paper mills along its course, as well as many watermills. The river is now used extensively by fishermen. It is a tourist destination and is photographed and traveled on by those wishing to enjoy its beauty. Along its course, especially near its source, several canoeing centres provide boats for rent.

== Weirs ==
More than one hundred weirs are used for the management of this river, as it makes its journey from the source at Fontaine-de-Vaucluse, through its bifurcation at L'Isle-sur-la-Sorgue and subsequent splitting into streams and courses that run into the rivers Ouvèze and Rhone.
