= André Louis Bosson =

French flying ace (1894–1918)

- Born: June 1, 1894; Esmans, France
- Died: July 20, 1918 (aged 24)
- Military career
- Allegiance: France
- Branch: Sapper; aviation
- Rank: Sergent
- Unit: Escadrille 62
- Awards: Médaille militaire, Croix de Guerre

Sergente André Louis Bosson (1894–1918) was a French World War I flying ace credited with seven aerial victories, including one shared with Jean-Paul Favre de Thierrens.

== Military service ==
Bosson began military service as a sapper on 6 September 1914. He would serve as such valorously until 1917. He would transfer to pilot's training, receiving his Military Pilot's Brevet on 25 September 1917.

Posted to Escadrille Spa62, he would score seven confirmed victories between 9 March and 4 June 1918. He was killed in action on 20 July 1918.

During his military career, he had earned both the Médaille Militaire and the Croix de Guerre.
