= Escadrille 62 =

Escadrille MF 62 - N 62 - SPA 62
- Active: 1915
- Country: France
- Branch: French Air Service
- Type: Reconnaissance/Pursuit
- Engagements: World War I

Escadrille 62 is a French Air Force squadron. It was founded on 11 August 1915 at Lyon–Bron Airport.

== History ==
Escadrille 62 was originally equipped with Farman two-seater reconnaissance aircraft; thus, its first designation was Escadrille MF62. Its first assignment was to VI Armée of the French Army. On 5 May 1916, it was incorporated into a larger ad hoc unit, Groupe de Combat de la Somme—the other units included in the group were Escadrille N3, Escadrille N26, Escadrille N73, and Escadrille N103. On 25 May 1916, it rearmed with Nieuports, becoming Escadrille N62. Because the escadrille was a temporary augmentation to the groupe, it was detached and reassigned to the VI Armée as that unit's Escadrille d' Armée for the remainder of the war.

Escadrille 62 won five citations during its short participation in the First World War. The first, in January 1917, was for the destruction of 15 enemy aircraft and six observation balloons. On 16 November 1917, its second citation was for destroying 15 more aircraft; the escadrille was then entitled to wear a fourragère signifying its right to the Croix de Guerre. At about the same time, it also re-equipped with SPADs to become Escadrille Spa62. They used their new aircraft for deep photographic reconnaissance missions 50 km (31 mi) behind enemy lines. On 25 January 1918, they took 180 photos; on 2 February they took 130 more. They were cited for this on 7 February 1918. On 18 July 1918, they were again cited for destruction of enemy aircraft—20 airplanes and an observation balloon. Their final citation came after war's end, on 18 December 1918, crediting them with 19 more victories; it entitled the escadrille's members to wear the fourragère of the Médaille Militaire. Escadrille 62 was credited with a wartime record of 68 destroyed enemy airplanes and seven downed observation balloons.

Escadrille SPA.62 continues to serve in the current French Air Force.

== Commanding officers ==
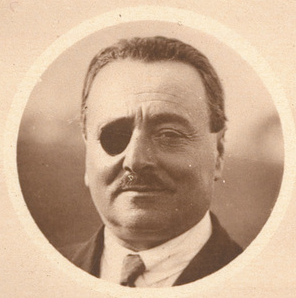
François Coli

- Lieutenant Horment
- Capitaine François Coli
- Capitaine Blaumautier

== Notable personnel ==
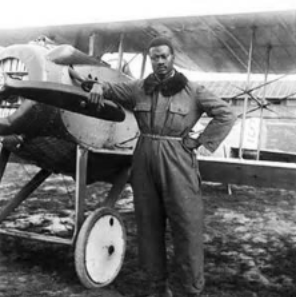
Sargent Pierre Réjon

]

- Marcel Bloch
- Charles Borzecki
- André Louis Bosson
- François Coli
- Jean-Paul Favre de Thierrens
- Charles Quette* Paul Tarascon
- Pierre Réjon, the first Black military pilot in France and the first French pilot of African descent to have an officially homologated aerial victory, serving with the escadrille from June 1918.

== Aircraft ==
- Maurice Farman
- Nieuport
- SPAD
