= Charles Quette =

French World War I flying ace

- Born: 19 May 1895; Paris, France
- Died: 5 June 1918 (aged 23) (missing in action)
- Military career
- Allegiance: France
- Branch: Infantry; aviation
- Rank: Sous lieutenant
- Units: 89e Regiment d'Infanterie; Escadrille MS.38; Escadrille C.64; Escadrille N.62
- Awards: Médaille militaire Croix de Guerre; Mentioned in Dispatches thrice

Sous lieutenant Charles Alfred Quette (19 May 1895 – 5 June 1918) was a French World War I flying ace credited with ten confirmed and five unconfirmed aerial victories.

== Early life ==
Charles Alfred Quette was born in Paris on 19 May 1895.

== World War I ==
Quette originally was a soldat de 2e classe in the infantry. He transferred to aviation and on 5 July 1915 joined Escadrille MS.38 as a mechanic. On 24 August, he transferred again, to Escadrille C.64 as a gunner/observer on Caudrons. His service there earned him two citations in orders. He then trained as a pilot. On 11 April 1917, he was promoted to Corporal and assigned to Escadrille N.62 as a Spad pilot.

Quette scored his first aerial victory on 22 July 1917. He was then awarded the Médaille militaire; the accompanying citation noted he had already been wounded twice. He was also promoted to sergeant on 25 August 1917. In September, Quette scored four more times to become an ace. A promotion to adjutant followed.

Between 15 March and 4 June 1918, Quette scored five more times. On 5 June, having been promoted to temporary sous lieutenant five days prior, Quette disappeared and was posted missing in action. On 9 July 1918, he was mentioned in dispatches for his ten victories.

== Honors and awards ==
Médaille Militaire

The citation for the award read: Pilot of Escadrille N62. Young and full of courage and sang-froid. He has distinguished himself in many situations and has had numerous combats, during the course of which his plane was hit several times by enemy fire. On 22 July 1917, he downed a German plane after a difficult combat. Wounded twice and cited in orders twice during the course of the war.

Croix de Guerre also awarded

== See also ==
- List of people who disappeared
