= Canton of L'Isle-sur-la-Sorgue =

Coordinates: 43°55′33″N 5°02′24″E

L'Isle-sur-la-Sorgue
- Canton
- Country: France
- Region: Provence-Alpes-Côte d'Azur
- Department: Vaucluse
- No. of communes: {{{nbcomm}}}
- Area: 121.53 km^{2} (46.92 sq mi)
- Population (2023): 34,162
  - Density: 281.10/km^{2} (728.04/sq mi)
- INSEE code: 84 09

The canton of L'Isle-sur-la-Sorgue is a French administrative division in the department of Vaucluse and region Provence-Alpes-Côte d'Azur.

== Composition ==
At the French canton reorganisation which came into effect in March 2015, the canton was reduced from 9 to 5 communes (population in 2012):

- Châteauneuf-de-Gadagne : 3,279 inhabitants
- Fontaine-de-Vaucluse : 653 inhabitants
- L'Isle-sur-la-Sorgue : 18,902 inhabitants
- Saumane-de-Vaucluse : 911 inhabitants
- Le Thor : 8,416 inhabitants
