= Marcel Bloch (aviator) =

French flying ace (1890–1938)

Marcel Robert Leopold Bloch
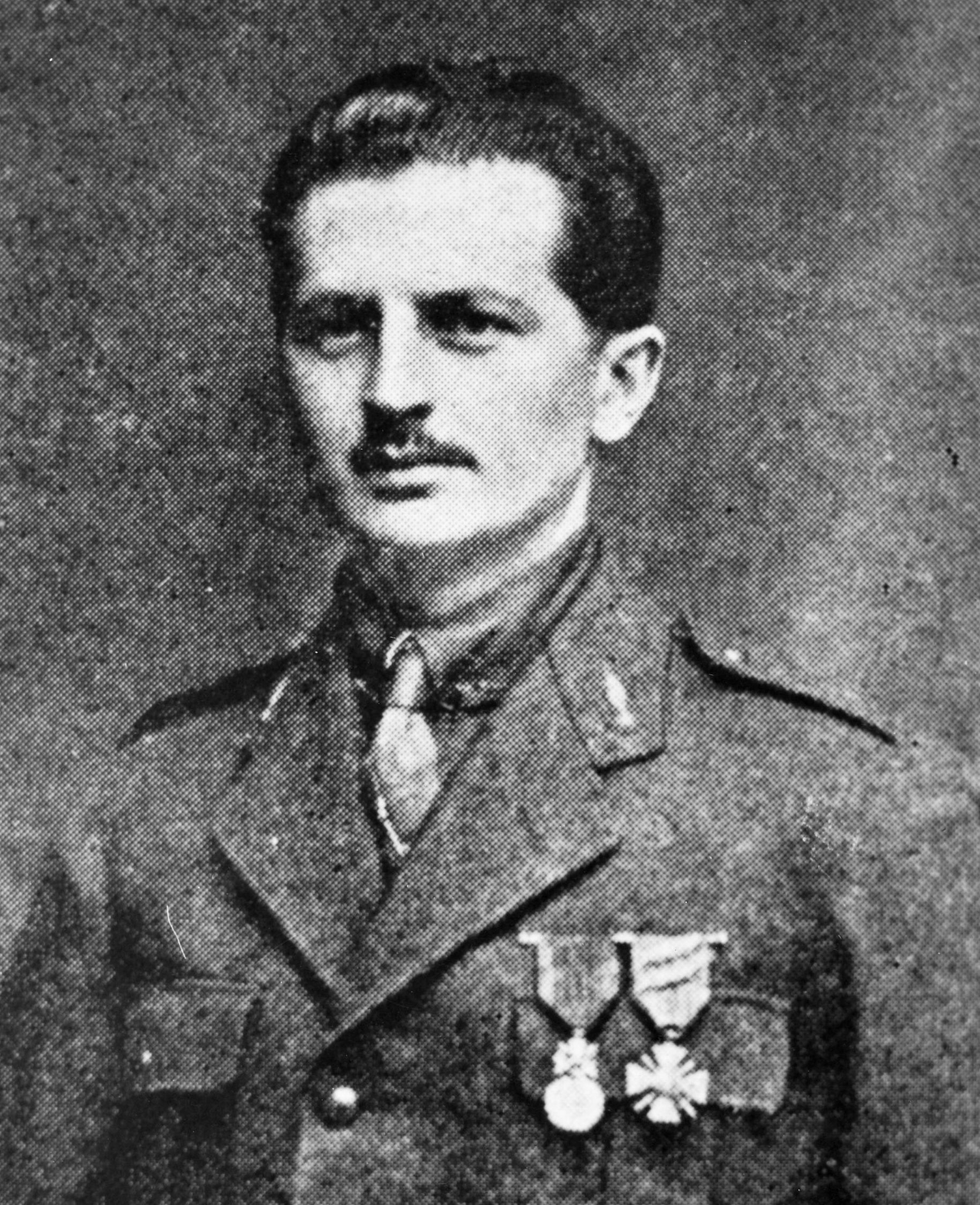
- Born: 21 July 1890; La Chaux de Fonds, Switzerland
- Died: 29 March 1938 (aged 48); Czechoslovakia
- Military career
- Allegiance: France
- Branch: Flying services
- Service years: 1914–1918
- Rank: Sous lieutenant
- Units: Escadrille 3, Escadrille 62
- Awards: Légion d'honneur, Médaille militaire, Croix de Guerre, Russian Order of Saint George and Order of Saint Anne
- Other work: disbanded by Vichy government.

Sous Lieutenant Marcel Robert Leopold Bloch (French: [maʁsɛl blɔk]) was a World War I flying ace who fought for the French on both Eastern and Western Fronts. He was credited with five aerial victories, all scored against German observation balloons.

== World War I service ==
Bloch volunteered for the French military on 7 September 1916, and was assigned to aviation service. After pilot training, he was granted Military Pilot's Brevet No. 2571 on 12 October 1915. Bloch was originally assigned to fly a Nieuport for Escadrille 3 but transferred to Escadrille 62 on 25 May 1916. He became a balloon buster ace, destroying five German observation balloons between 26 June and 1 October 1916. In the process of destroying number three, on 3 July 1916, he was seriously wounded twice. He downed his last two on 30 September and 1 October.

In 1917, Bloch was transferred from combat duty to a military mission. On 23 March, he was transferred to the Russian Front. He sustained serious injuries on 8 May 1917, when he suffered a flying accident. After many months in hospital, he was assigned to the French Mission to the United States on 10 September 1918.

== Postwar life ==
On 1 March 1919, Bloch returned to France. He would never recover from his war wounds, succumbing to them 29 March 1938 in Czechoslovakia.

== Honors and awards ==
- Légion d'Honneur
- Médaille Militaire
- Croix de Guerre
- Russian Order of Saint George
- Russian Order of Saint Ann

== Sources ==
- Franks, Norman; Bailey, Frank (1993). Over the Front: The Complete Record of the Fighter Aces and Units of the United States and French Air Services, 1914–1918. Grub Street Publishing. ISBN 978-0-948817-54-0.
- Franks, Norman (2000). Nieuport Aces of World War 1. Osprey Publishing, 2000. ISBN 1-85532-961-1, ISBN 978-1-85532-961-4.
