= Saumane-de-Vaucluse =

Saumane-de-Vaucluse Saumana de Vauclusa (Occitan)
- Commune
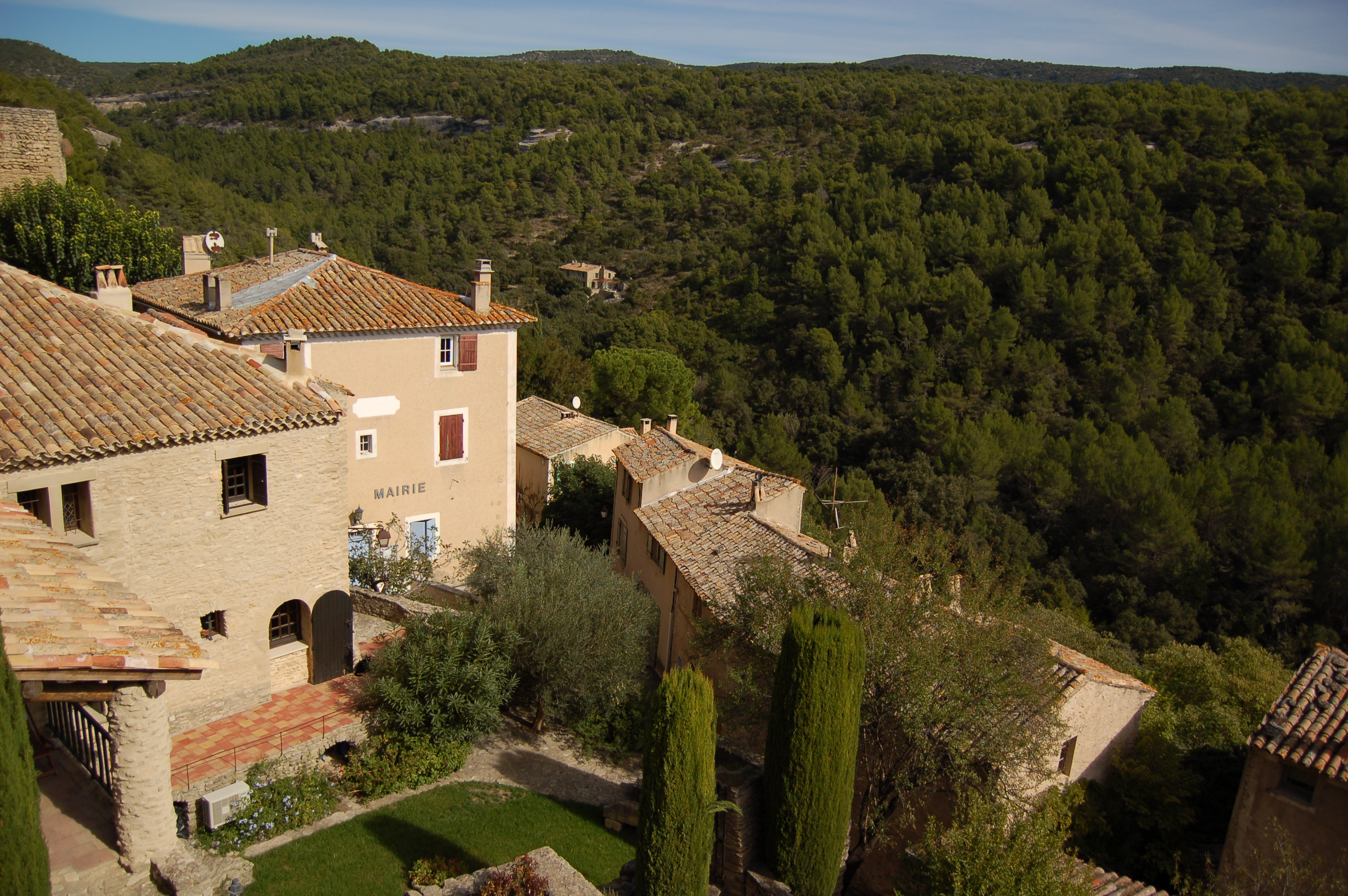
- Saumane-de-Vaucluse Town Hall

- Coat of arms
- Location of Saumane-de-Vaucluse
- Location within France Location within Provence-Alpes-Côte d'Azur
- Coordinates: 43°56′14″N 5°06′25″E
- Country: France
- Region: Provence-Alpes-Côte d'Azur
- Department: Vaucluse
- Arrondissement: Avignon
- Canton: L'Isle-sur-la-Sorgue
- Intercommunality: Pays des Sorgues et des Monts de Vaucluse

Government
  - Mayor (2020–2026): Laurence Chabaud-Geva
- Area^{1}: 20.81 km^{2} (8.03 sq mi)
- Elevation: 140 m (460 ft)
- Highest elevation: 671 m (2,201 ft)
- Lowest elevation: 60 m (200 ft)
- Population (2023): 886
  - Density: 42.6/km^{2} (110/sq mi)
- Time zone: UTC+01:00 (CET)
  - Summer (DST): UTC+02:00 (CEST)
- INSEE/Postal code: 84124 /84800
- ^{1} French Land Register data, which excludes lakes, ponds, glaciers > 1 km^{2} (0.386 sq mi or 247 acres) and river estuaries.

Saumane-de-Vaucluse (French pronunciation: [soman də voklyz]; Occitan: Saumana de Vauclusa) is a commune in the southeastern French department of Vaucluse. As of 2023, the population of the commune was 886. It was the boyhood home of the Marquis de Sade.

== See also ==
- Communes of the Vaucluse department
