= L'Isle-sur-la-Sorgue =

L'Isle-sur-la-Sorgue L'Illa de Sòrga (Occitan)
- Commune
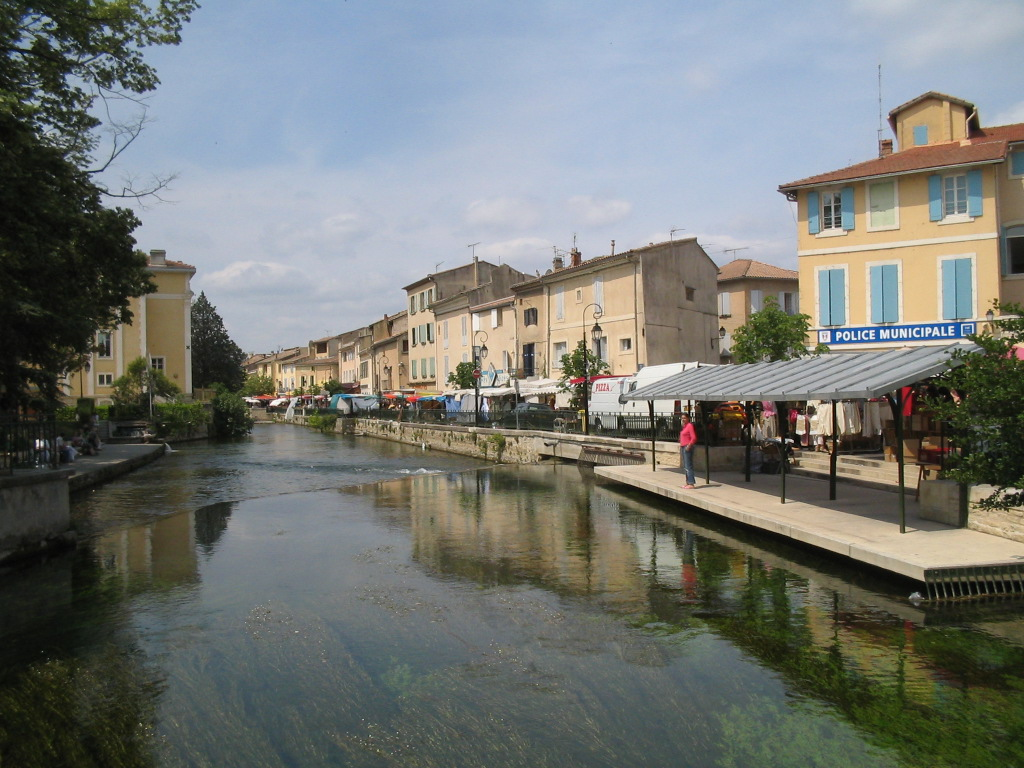
- The village of L'Isle-sur-la-Sorgue, with the river in the foreground

- Coat of arms
- Location of L'Isle-sur-la-Sorgue
- Location within France Location within Provence-Alpes-Côte d'Azur
- Coordinates: 43°55′12″N 5°03′18″E
- Country: France
- Region: Provence-Alpes-Côte d'Azur
- Department: Vaucluse
- Arrondissement: Avignon
- Canton: L'Isle-sur-la-Sorgue
- Intercommunality: Pays des Sorgues et des Monts de Vaucluse

Government
  - Mayor (2020–2026): Pierre Gonzalvez (LR)
- Area^{1}: 44.57 km^{2} (17.21 sq mi)
- Highest elevation: 246 m (807 ft)
- Lowest elevation: 52 m (171 ft)
- Population (2023): 20,244
  - Density: 454.2/km^{2} (1,176/sq mi)
- Time zone: UTC+01:00 (CET)
  - Summer (DST): UTC+02:00 (CEST)
- INSEE/Postal code: 84054 /84800
- ^{1} French Land Register data, which excludes lakes, ponds, glaciers > 1 km^{2} (0.386 sq mi or 247 acres) and river estuaries.

L'Isle-sur-la-Sorgue (French pronunciation: [lil syʁ la sɔʁɡ]; Provençal: L'Illa de Sòrga [ˈlilɔ de ˈsɔʀɡɔ] or L'Illa de Venissa [ˈlilɔ de veˈnisɔ]) is a town and commune on the Sorgue river in Southeastern France. Politically, the commune is in the arrondissement of Avignon within the department of Vaucluse, in the région of Provence-Alpes-Côte d'Azur.

The small town is known for its many antique shops and hosts antique markets most Sundays. It has many waterside cafés and restaurants, all within walking distance of each other. Its many water wheels throughout the town are still in working order, and it is sometimes known as Venise Comtadine, or the Venice of the Comtat Venaissin.

L'Isle-sur-la-Sorgue is twinned with the towns of Penicuik in Scotland and Anagni in Italy.

== History ==
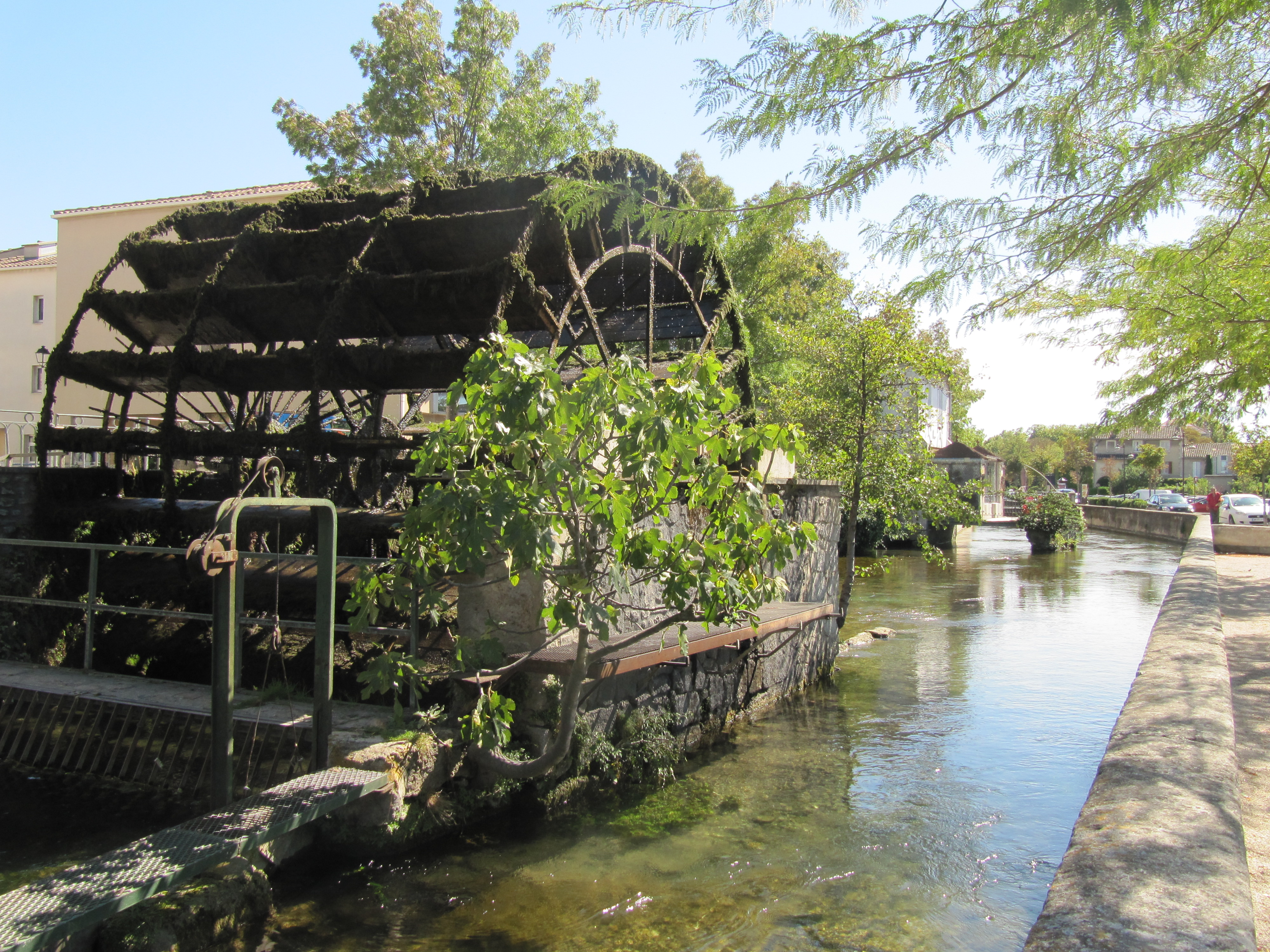
One of the several water wheels in the town

The Hôtel de Ville

A busy commerce developed until there were two annual fairs and two weekly markets: the current Sunday open-air market originated on 9 November 1596.

As early as the 12th century, the river Sorgue served defensively as a moat around ramparts which surrounded the town until 1795.

The Hôtel de Ville was extensively restored in 1839.

Originally known as "Insula", the town to recognise the role of the river which surrounded it by officially adopting the name of "L'Isle-sur-la-Sorgue" on 18 August 1890.

== Population ==
Historical population

Year	Pop.	±% p.a.
1793	5,000	—
1800	5,155	+0.44%
1806	5,170	+0.05%
1821	5,812	+0.78%
1831	6,052	+0.41%
1836	6,277	+0.73%
1841	6,262	−0.05%
1846	6,392	+0.41%
1851	6,503	+0.34%
1856	6,500	−0.01%
1861	6,517	+0.05%
1866	6,478	−0.12%
1872	6,337	−0.37%
1876	6,508	+0.67%
1881	6,208	−0.94%
1886	6,317	+0.35%
1891	6,003	−1.01%
1896	6,266	+0.86%
1901	6,514	+0.78%

Year	Pop.	±% p.a.
1906	6,462	−0.16%
1911	6,062	−1.27%
1921	5,739	−0.55%
1926	6,134	+1.34%
1931	6,396	+0.84%
1936	6,505	+0.34%
1946	6,922	+0.62%
1954	7,590	+1.16%
1962	8,704	+1.73%
1968	9,740	+1.89%
1975	11,508	+2.41%
1982	12,728	+1.45%
1990	15,564	+2.55%
1999	16,971	+0.97%
2007	18,799	+1.29%
2012	18,902	+0.11%
2017	19,421	+0.54%
2023	20,244	+0.69%

Source: EHESS and INSEE (1968-2023)

== Twins cities ==
- Penicuik, Scotland
- Anagni, Italy

== Notable landmarks ==
- Jewish cemetery of L'Isle-sur-la-Sorgue

== See also ==
- Communes of the Vaucluse department
