= Notre-Dame-du-Lac Church =

Church in Le Thor, France

Coordinates: 43°55′47″N 4°59′41″E

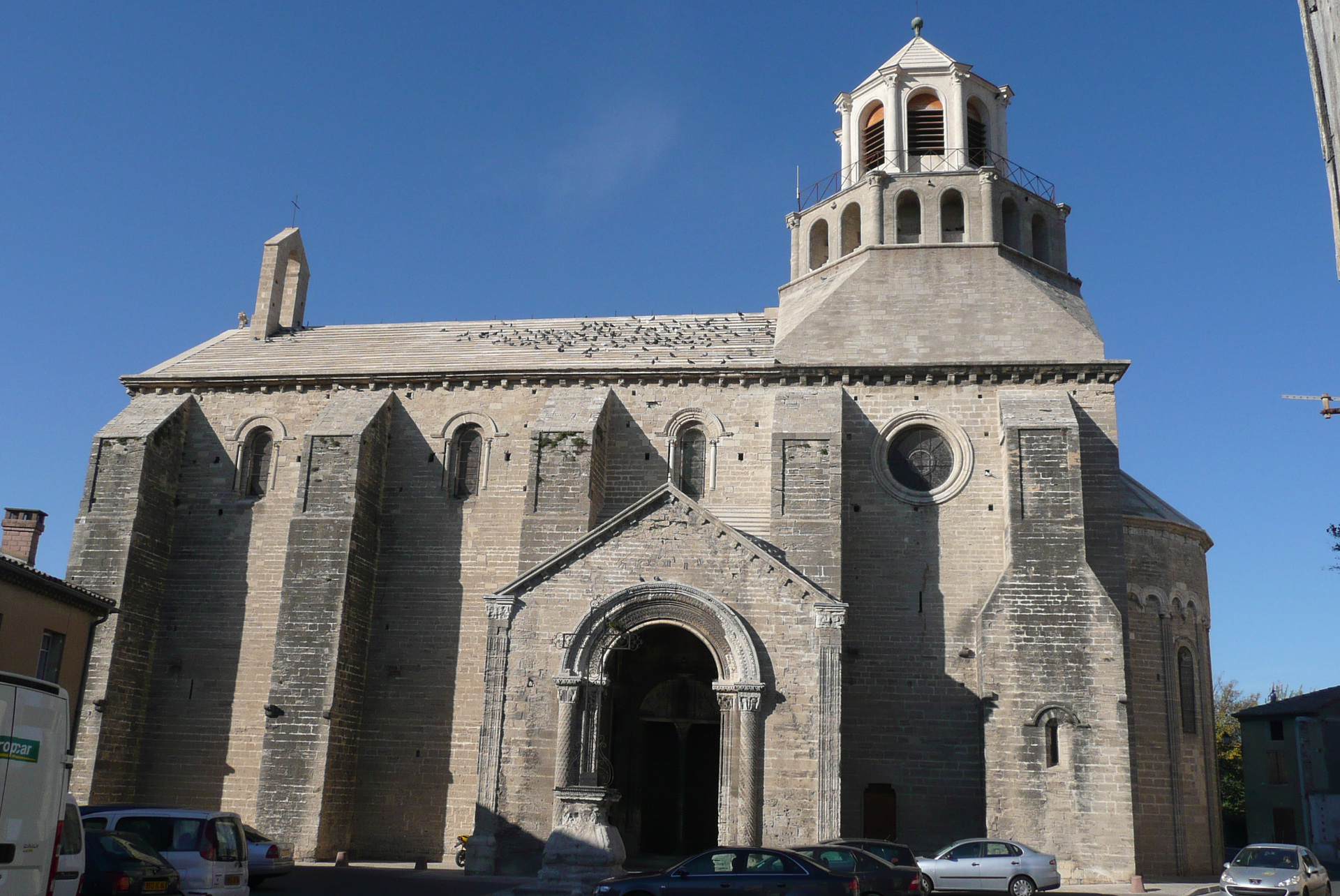
Notre-Dame-du-Lac

Notre-Dame-du-Lac is a Roman Catholic church in the town of Le Thor in Provence, France. It was built in the 12th-century in the Romanesque architectural tradition.

Notre-Dame-du-Lac is listed as a monument historique since 1840.
