= Le Thor =

Le Thor Lo Tòr (Occitan)
- Commune
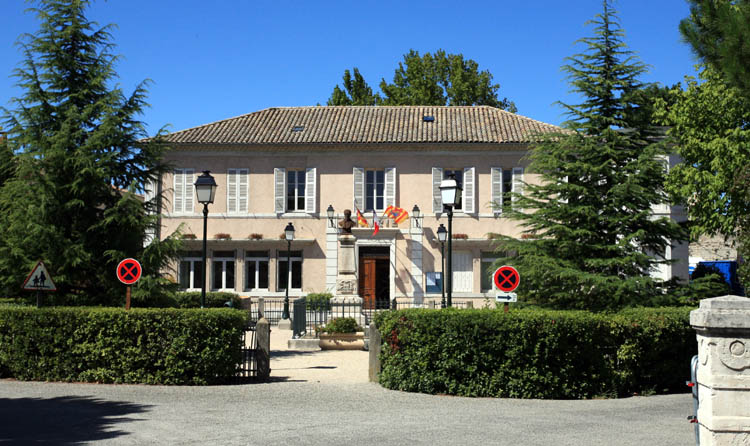
- Town hall

- Coat of arms
- Location of Le Thor
- Location within France Location within Provence-Alpes-Côte d'Azur
- Coordinates: 43°55′48″N 4°59′42″E
- Country: France
- Region: Provence-Alpes-Côte d'Azur
- Department: Vaucluse
- Arrondissement: Avignon
- Canton: L'Isle-sur-la-Sorgue
- Intercommunality: CC du Pays des Sorgues et des Monts de Vaucluse

Government
  - Mayor (2020–2026): Yves Bayon de Noyer
- Area^{1}: 35.53 km^{2} (13.72 sq mi)
- Elevation: 53 m (174 ft)
- Highest elevation: 111 m (364 ft)
- Lowest elevation: 38 m (125 ft)
- Population (2023): 8,882
  - Density: 250.0/km^{2} (647.5/sq mi)
- Demonym: Thorois
- Time zone: UTC+01:00 (CET)
  - Summer (DST): UTC+02:00 (CEST)
- INSEE/Postal code: 84132 /84250
- ^{1} French Land Register data, which excludes lakes, ponds, glaciers > 1 km^{2} (0.386 sq mi or 247 acres) and river estuaries.

Le Thor (French pronunciation: [lə tɔʁ]; Occitan: Lo Tòr) is a commune in the Vaucluse department in the Provence-Alpes-Côte d'Azur region in Southeastern France.

It has an attractive Romanesque church, Notre-Dame-du-Lac, an 11th-century castle in ruins, the Château de Thouzon, as well as an Urgonian Limestone cave, the Grottes de Thouzon (also known as the Grotte aux Fées), accessible for visits to the public.

== Population ==
Historical population
Year	Pop.	±% p.a.
1968	3,470	—
1975	4,003	+2.06%
1982	5,023	+3.30%
1990	5,941	+2.12%
1999	6,619	+1.21%
2007	7,722	+1.95%
2012	8,416	+1.74%
2017	9,071	+1.51%
2023	8,882	−0.35%
Source: INSEE

== Notable residents ==
- Alexey Brodovitch (1898–1971), graphic designer of Russian descent.
- Pierre Salinger (1925–2004), a White House Press Secretary to US Presidents John F. Kennedy and Lyndon B. Johnson, lived in "La Bastide rose" until his death.

== See also ==
- Communes of the Vaucluse department
