= Canton of Gordes =

Coordinates: 43°54′21″N 5°14′40″E

Gordes
- Former canton
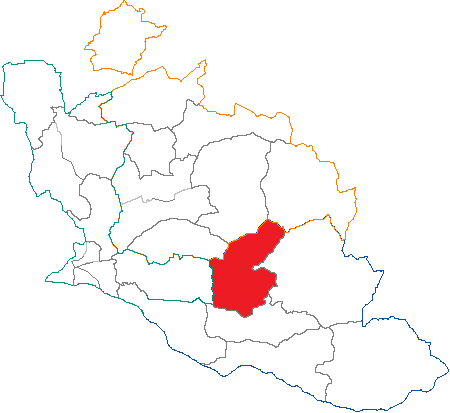
- Country: France
- Region: Provence-Alpes-Côte d'Azur
- Department: Vaucluse
- No. of communes: {{{nbcomm}}}
- Disbanded: 2015
- Area: 188.65 km^{2} (72.84 sq mi)
- Population (2012): 5,890
  - Density: 31.2/km^{2} (80.9/sq mi)

The canton of Gordes is a French former administrative division in the department of Vaucluse and region Provence-Alpes-Côte d'Azur. It had 5,890 inhabitants (2012). It was disbanded following the French canton reorganisation which came into effect in March 2015. It consisted of 8 communes, which joined the canton of Apt in 2015.

== Composition ==
The communes in the canton of Gordes:

- Beaumettes
- Gordes
- Goult
- Joucas
- Lioux
- Murs
- Roussillon
- Saint-Pantaléon
