= Ventoux AOC =

- Wine region
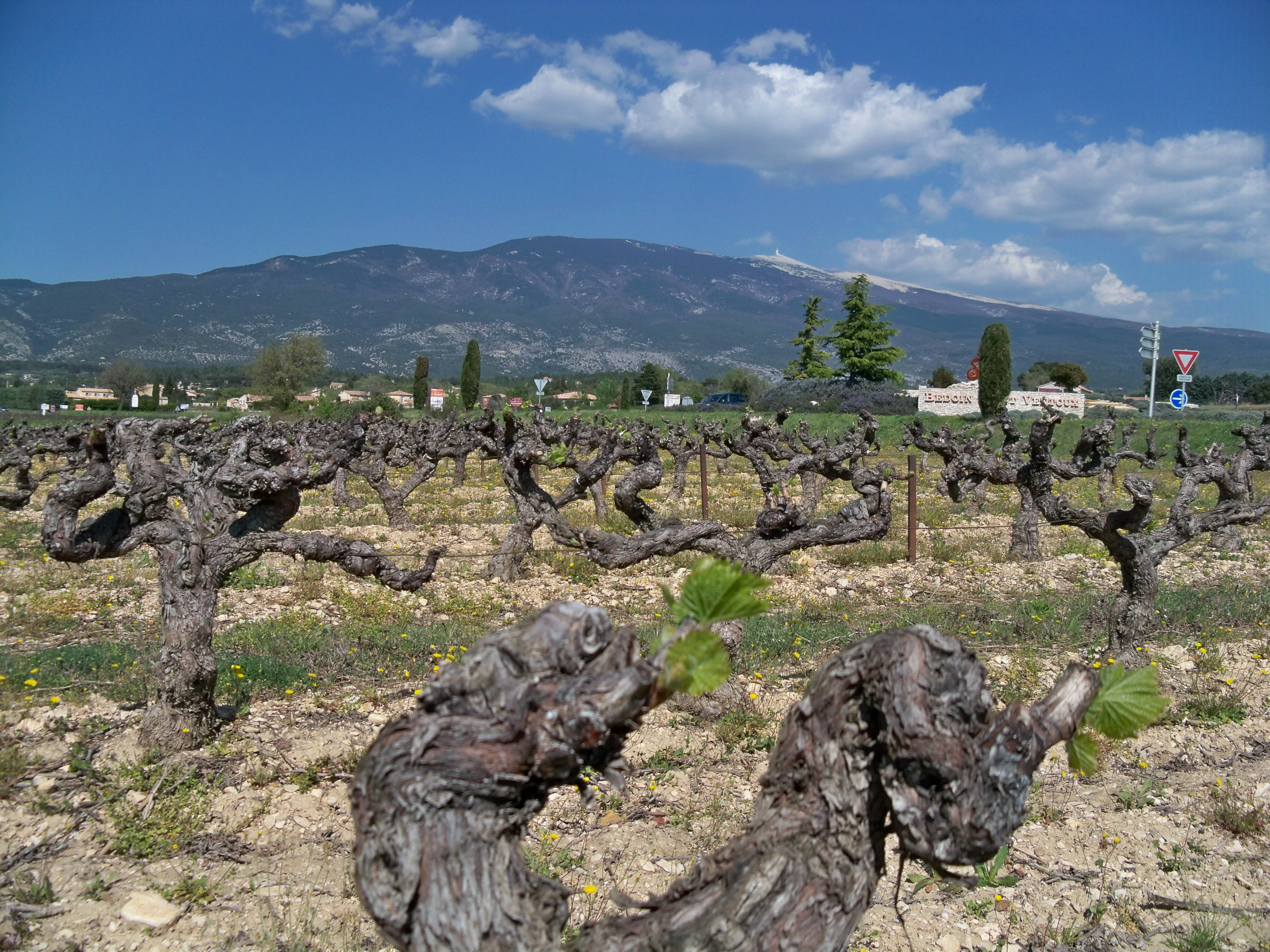
- Type: Appellation d'Origine Contrôlée
- Year established: 1973
- Years of wine industry: 2,000
- Country: France
- Part of: Rhône Valley
- Climate region: Mediterranean
- Soil conditions: limestone, red tertiary alluvial soils
- Size of planted vineyards: 5,873 ha
- No. of vineyards: 1,339
- Grapes produced: Grenache, Syrah, Cinsault, Mourvèdre, Carignan, Bourboulenc, Grenache blanc, Clairette, Roussanne
- No. of wineries: 137
- Wine produced: red, white, rosé, & vin primeur
- Comments: 2005

Ventoux AOC (French pronunciation: [vɑ̃tu]; known as Côtes du Ventoux AOC until 2008) is a wine-growing AOC in the southeastern region of the Rhône wine region of France, where the wines are produced in 51 communes of the Vaucluse département along the lower slopes of the Ventoux mountain and at the foot of the Vaucluse Mountains. The neighbouring appellation of Luberon AOC stretches along its southern border and is separated from it by the Calavon river.

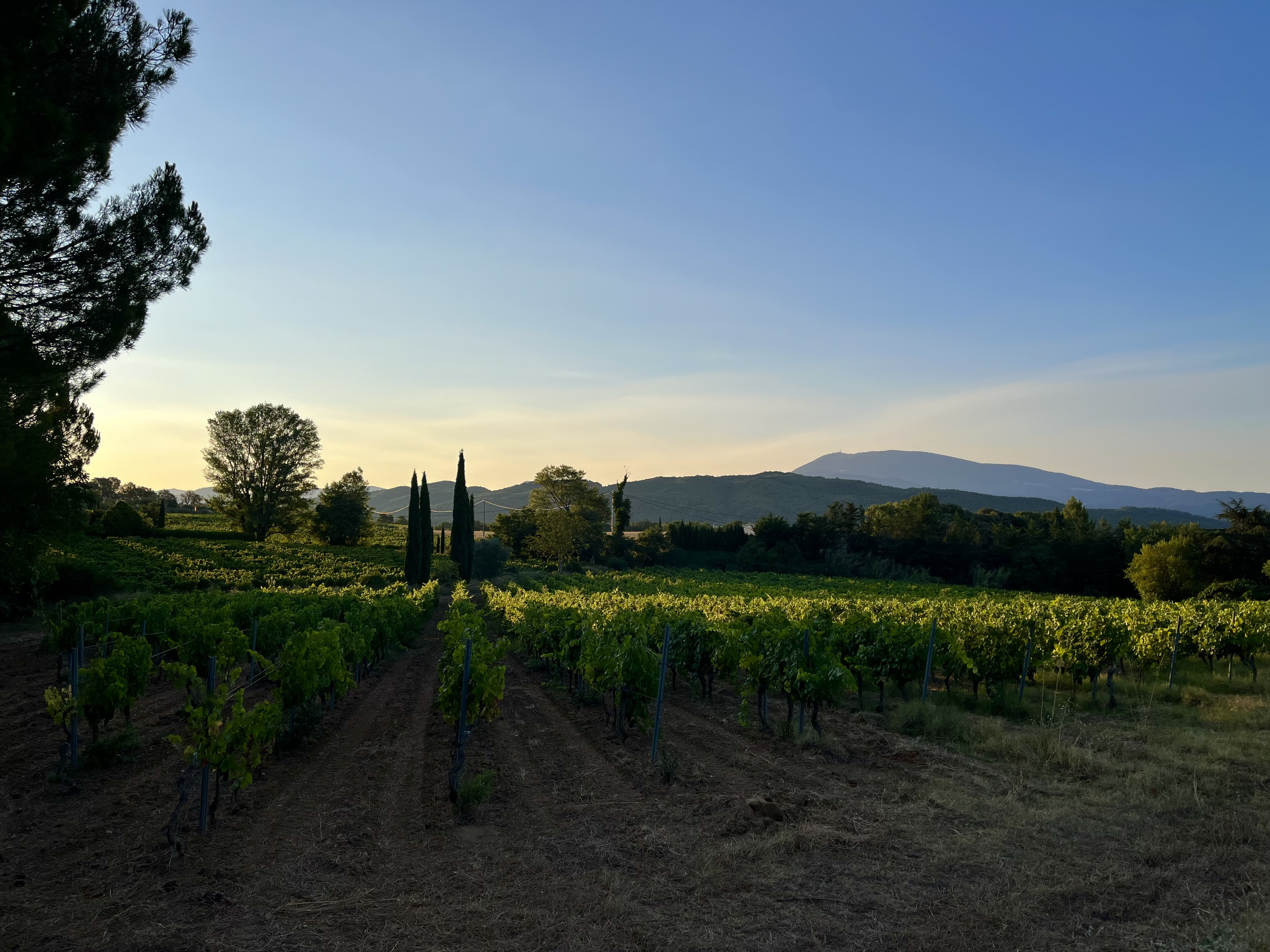
Vineyard near Vaison-la-Romaine with the Mont Ventoux in the background.

The three main areas of the region, the Malaucène basin, the foothills of the Mont Ventoux to the east of Carpentras and to the north of Cavaillon are less ravaged by the Mistral due to some shelter afforded by the Ventoux-Vaucluse-Luberon mountain range. Archeological discoveries of wine making equipment have dated that wine has been produced in the area at least since around 30 AD.

== Wines ==
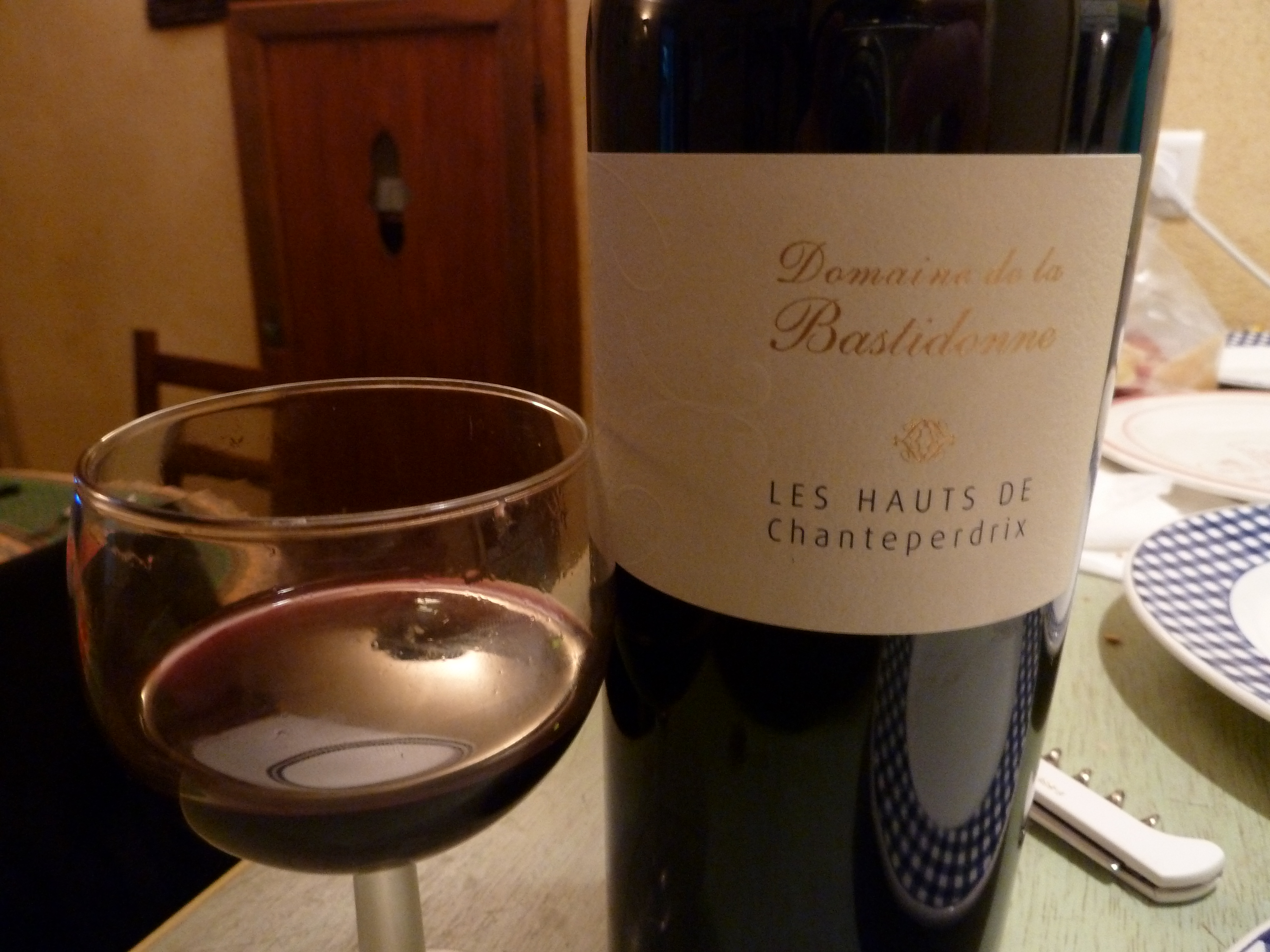
A red wine from the Côtes du Ventoux AOC

Red and rosé wines are made from Grenache, Syrah, Cinsault, Mourvèdre, and Carignan (maximum 30%). Other varieties which may be used to a maximum of 20%.The red wine is distinctly characterised by its aromas of black fruit, spice, and pepper. White wines are produced from Clairette blanche, Bourboulenc, Grenache blanc, and Roussane (maximum 30%). A Primeur wine is also produced in all three colours. The minimum alcoholic content for all wines is decreed at 11%. The reds, which comprise approximately 55-60% of the production, are light and fruity. All wines are generally consumed while they are still young.

== Economy ==
The Ventoux wines are produced by a total of 1,339 concerns which include 1,315 growers, 113 private wineries, 16 cooperative wineries, and 8 producer/merchants.

The vineyards are in the communes of Apt, Aubignan, Beaumettes, Beaumont-du-Ventoux, Bédoin, Blauvac, Bonnieux, Cabrières-d'Avignon, Caromb, Carpentras, Caseneuve, Crestet, Crillon-le-Brave, Entrechaux, Flassan, Fontaine-de-Vaucluse, Gargas, Gignac, Gordes, Goult, Joucas, Lagnes, La Roque-sur-Pernes, Le Barroux, Le Beaucet, Lioux, Loriol-du-Comtat, Malaucène, Malemort-du-Comtat, Maubec, Mazan, Méthamis, Modène, Mormoiron, Murs, Pernes, Robion, Roussillon, Rustrel, Saignon, Saumane, Saint-Didier, Saint-Hippolyte-le-Graveyron, Saint-Martin-de-Castillon, Saint-Pantaléon, Saint-Pierre-de-Vassols, Saint-Saturnin-lès-Apt, Venasque, Viens, Villars and Villes-sur-Auzon.

== See also ==
- List of Vins de Primeur
