= Vaucluse Mountains =

Range of mountains in south-eastern France

Coordinates: 44.1744°N 5.2789°E

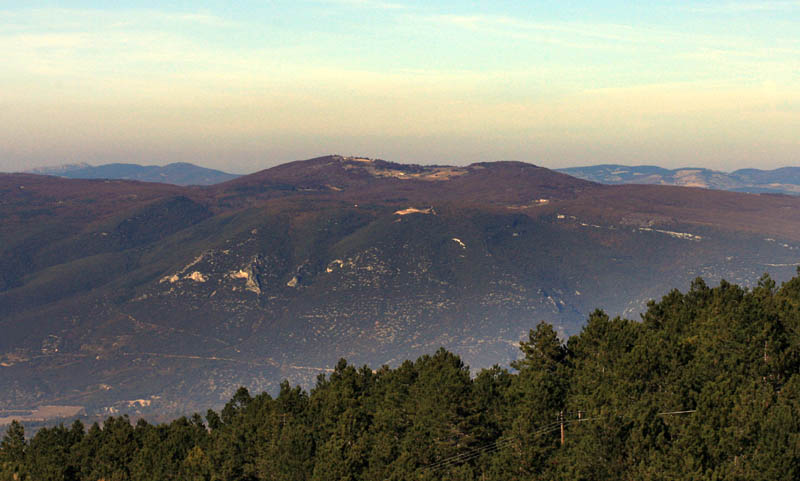
Signal de Saint-Pierre in the Vaucluse Mountains

A location map (the Vaucluse Mountains are in the lower left)

The Vaucluse Mountains (French: Monts de Vaucluse) are a mountain range of the French Prealps located in the departement of Vaucluse, between the Luberon Massif and Mont Ventoux.

The highest peak is Signal de Saint-Pierre, which reaches the height of 1,256 metres (4,121 ft).

== Location and topography ==
Oriented east-west, the Toulourenc river and the Jabron torrent border the mountain range to the north, to the south by the Calavon valley and beyond the Luberon, to the west and north-west by the Comtat Venaissin plain, and to the east it extends nearly all the way to the Durance.

The northern part constitutes the secondary range of Ventoux – the highest point of the massif with an altitude of 1,910 m (6,270 ft) – and of the Lure (1,825 m (5,988 ft)), separated by the plateau of Albion (1,393 m (4,570 ft)).

The eastern part is a plateau of medium altitude which fluctuates between 800 and 1,000 m (2,600 and 3,300 ft) and culminates at the signal of Saint-Pierre at 1,256 m (4,121 ft) above sea level.

The western part is made up of a secondary range that travels from the region of Sault to the plain. The altitude varies between 300 and 1,000 m (980 and 3,280 ft). West of Mont Ventoux, Les Dentelles de Montmirail (The Laces of Montmirail), which has an altitude of 722 m (2,369 ft), take their name from the shape obtained by the erosion of the rock.

The Luberon regional natural park extends to the southern part of the massif.

== Main mountain peaks ==
- Mont Ventoux, 1,910 m (6,270 ft), highest point of the massif
- Montagne de Lure, 1,825 m (5,988 ft)
- Sommet de l'Homme, 1,637 m (5,371 ft)
- Contras, 1,633 m (5,358 ft)
- Le Tréboux, 1,535 m (5,036 ft)
- Montagne d'Albion, 1,413 m (4,636 ft)
- Signal de Saint-Pierre, 1,256 m (4,121 ft)
- Colline de Berre, 1,187 m (3,894 ft)
- Le Buisseron, 1,120 m (3,670 ft)
- La Grand-Montagne, 1,051 m (3,448 ft)
- Le Cluyer, 1,041 m (3,415 ft)
- Le Pointu, 872 m (2,861 ft)

== Geology and hydrography ==
The massif is made up of Mesozoic limestone, often permeable. The water sinks into the rock, creating underground networks (karstic system), emerging at low points such as the Fontaine de Vaucluse.

There are numerous sinkholes, some of the deepest being:

- Le Souffleur in Saint-Christol (921 m (3,022 ft))
- Caladaïre, near Montsalier (667 m (2,188 ft))
- L'aven Autran (647 m (2,123 ft)) in Saint-Christol
- L'aven Jean Nouveau
- L'aven du Cavalon
- La source des Brieux
- L'aven des Mûres

== Municipalities of the Vaucluse mountains ==
There are numerous towns located on the Vaucluse mountains.

The 72,660 ha in Vaucluse is put forward with an impressive afforestation rate of up to 40%, and that is only if you consider the following municipalities: Apt, Beaumettes, Cabrières-d'Avignon, Caseneuve, Fontaine-de-Vaucluse, Gargas, Gignac, Gordes, Goult, Joucas, La Roque-sur-Pernes, Lagnes, Le Beaucet, Lioux, L'Isle-sur-la-Sorgue, Méthamis, Murs, Oppedette, Pernes-les-Fontaines, Roussillon, Rustrel, Saint-Didier, Sainte-Croix-à-Lauze, Saint-Pantaléon, Saint-Saturnin-lès-Apt, Saumane-de-Vaucluse, Velleron, Venasque, Viens et Villars... but various municipalities or parts of municipalities, such as Aurel, Le Beaucet, Monieux, Saint-Christol, Sault, etc.

== Distribution of population ==
The Vaucluse mountains are a plateau with a low density of inhabitants outside of villages and hamlets.

Several perched villages are found on the southern hillsides. Some examples are the municipalities of Méthamis, Venasque, Gordes, Murs, Joucas and Saint-Saturnin-lès-Apt.

== History ==
First trace of occupation date from the Neolithic period. The territory was occupied by several Celtic-Ligurian tribes. Numerous oppidums can be found on the foothills of the massif. The Romans used the Fontaine de Vaucluse.

Until the middle of the 3rd century, the major regional industry was that of iron, with rich soils in Roussillon, Gargas, Rustrel, and several other towns. There are artisanal stoves from Fontaine-de-Vaucluse to the ones in Simiane-la-Rotonde.

In the 11th century, “castrums” were created (perched fortifications around which villages developed).

With the arrival of the popes in Avignon, the culture of silk was introduced to the region. Gradually, the culture of mulberry developed, and its leaves served as food for the silkworms.

The religious wars affected some of the villages on the southern foothills of the massif. Cabrières-d'Avignon thus got razed during the massacre of the Vaudois of the Luberon.

Between 1720 and 1722 the papal army tried to prevent the Marseilles plague from invading the Papal States by building plague walls south of the Vaucluse mountains, in Lagnes, Cabrières-d'Avignon, and Murs.

On August 12 1793, the department of Vaucluse was created, consisting of the districts of Avignon and Carpentras, but also those of Orange and Apt, which previously belonged to the Bouches-du-Rhône department, as well as the canton of Sault, which belonged to the Basses-Alpes.

The mountainous area helped early resistance and many households during the German occupation. On November 11 1948, several municipalities in the Vaucluse mountains, such as Gordes (silver star degree) or Sault (silver-gilt star degree) received the Croix de Guerre 1939–1945.

In April 1965, due to its low population density and its soil, the Albion plateau was chosen for the installation of nuclear silos. Only 18 silos and 2 fire control stations (PCT) were built (budget restriction) out of the 27 silos and 3 fire control stations that were initially planned (early 1966), i.e. air base (BA200). The construction work ended in 1971.

In September 1996, President Jacques Chirac announced the closure and dismantling of the Albion facilities, due to the evolution of the European geostrategy (fall of the Eastern bloc). Furthermore the aging of missiles were too expensive to maintain, and it was judged unnecessary to upgrade them.

== Activities ==
Very well known for its cultivation of lavender, the economy of the plateau is essentially oriented towards agriculture (lavender, spelt and other types of cereals, goat breeding, etc.) and tourism (eco-friendly camping, hiking, mountain biking, caving, the Lavender Route...).
