= Canton of Bonnieux =

Coordinates: 43°49′58″N 5°17′24″E

Bonnieux
- Former canton
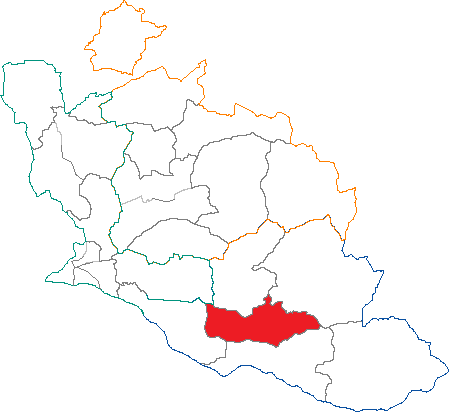
- Country: France
- Region: Provence-Alpes-Côte d'Azur
- Department: Vaucluse
- No. of communes: {{{nbcomm}}}
- Disbanded: 2015
- Area: 127.70 km^{2} (49.31 sq mi)
- Population (2012): 4,317
  - Density: 33.81/km^{2} (87.56/sq mi)

The canton of Bonnieux is a French administrative division in the department of Vaucluse and region Provence-Alpes-Côte d'Azur. It had 4,317 inhabitants (2012). It was disbanded following the French canton reorganisation which came into effect in March 2015. It consisted of 6 communes, which joined the canton of Apt in 2015.

== Composition ==
The communes in the canton of Bonnieux:

- Bonnieux
- Buoux
- Lacoste
- Ménerbes
- Oppède
- Sivergues
