= Ventoux =

Ventoux may refer to:

- Mont Ventoux
- Renault Ventoux engine
- Ventoux AOC, a French wine appellation formerly known as Côtes du Ventoux
