= Auribeau =

- Commune
- Aerial view of the village of Auribeau
- Location of Auribeau
- Location within France Location within Provence-Alpes-Côte d'Azur
- Coordinates: 43°50′15″N 5°27′34″E
- Country: France
- Region: Provence-Alpes-Côte d'Azur
- Department: Vaucluse
- Arrondissement: Apt
- Canton: Apt
- Intercommunality: CC Pays Apt-Luberon

Government
  - Mayor (2020–2026): Roland Cicero
- Area^{1}: 7.5 km^{2} (2.9 sq mi)
- Elevation: 600 m (2,000 ft)
- Highest elevation: 1,125 m (3,691 ft)
- Lowest elevation: 513 m (1,683 ft)
- Population (2023): 68
  - Density: 9.1/km^{2} (23/sq mi)
- Time zone: UTC+01:00 (CET)
  - Summer (DST): UTC+02:00 (CEST)
- INSEE/Postal code: 84006 /84400
- ^{1} French Land Register data, which excludes lakes, ponds, glaciers > 1 km^{2} (0.386 sq mi or 247 acres) and river estuaries.

Auribeau (French pronunciation: [oʁibo]; Occitan: Auribèu) is a commune in the Vaucluse department in the Provence-Alpes-Côte d'Azur region in southeastern France.

== Notable people ==
- P. G. Wodehouse author

== See also ==
- Communes of the Vaucluse department
