= Roussillon, Vaucluse =

Roussillon
- Commune
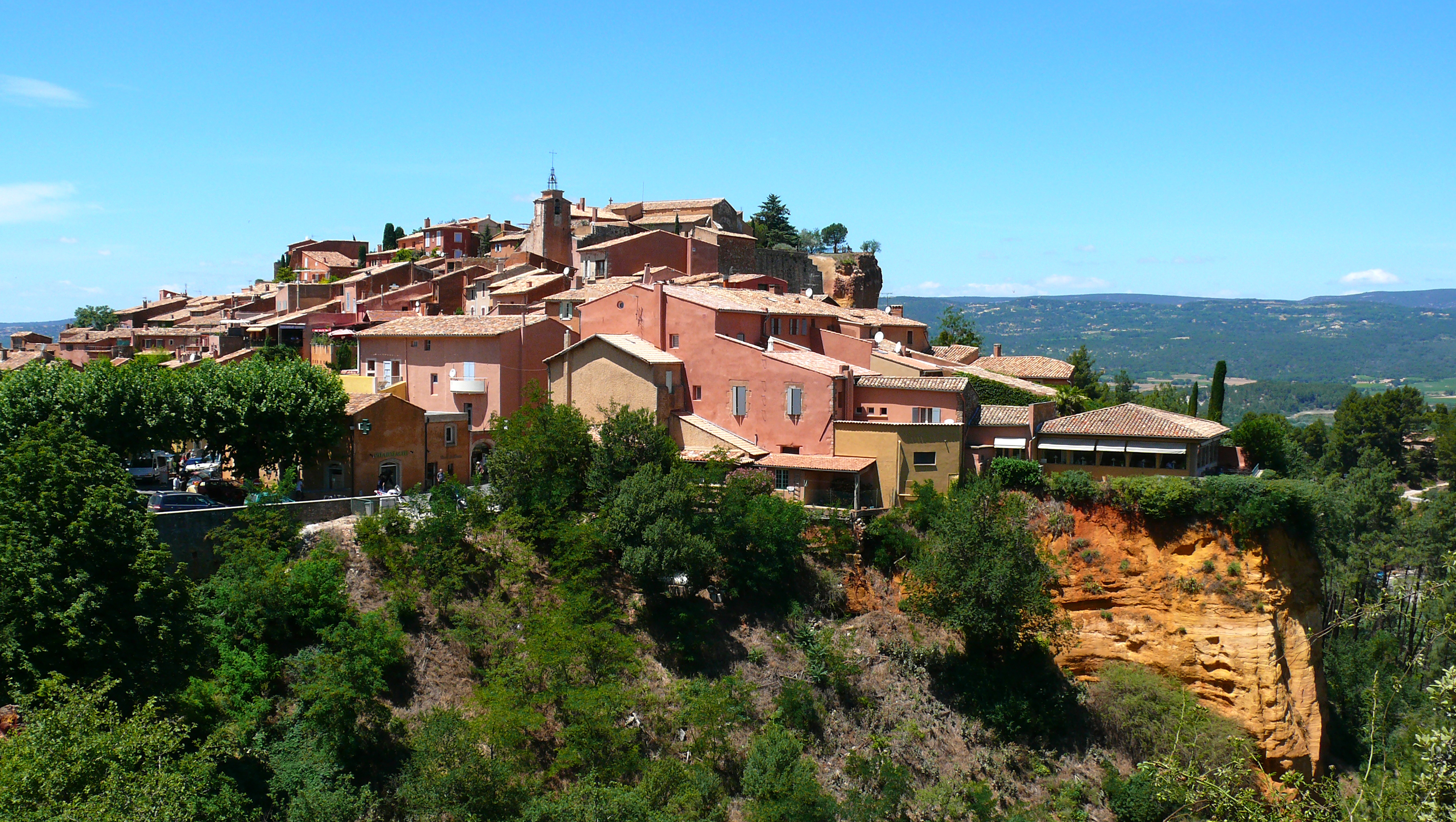
- A view of the village of Roussillon

- Coat of arms
- Location of Roussillon
- Location within France Location within Provence-Alpes-Côte d'Azur
- Coordinates: 43°54′11″N 5°17′37″E
- Country: France
- Region: Provence-Alpes-Côte d'Azur
- Department: Vaucluse
- Arrondissement: Apt
- Canton: Apt

Government
  - Mayor (2020–2026): Gisèle Bonnelly
- Area^{1}: 29.77 km^{2} (11.49 sq mi)
- Elevation: 343 m (1,125 ft)
- Highest elevation: 365 m (1,198 ft)
- Lowest elevation: 159 m (522 ft)
- Population (2023): 1,333
  - Density: 44.78/km^{2} (116.0/sq mi)
- Time zone: UTC+01:00 (CET)
  - Summer (DST): UTC+02:00 (CEST)
- INSEE/Postal code: 84102 /84220
- ^{1} French Land Register data, which excludes lakes, ponds, glaciers > 1 km^{2} (0.386 sq mi or 247 acres) and river estuaries.

Roussillon (French pronunciation: [ʁusijɔ̃]; Occitan: Rossilhon) is a commune in the Vaucluse department of the Provence-Alpes-Côte d'Azur region in Southeastern France. It is a member of Les Plus Beaux Villages de France (The Most Beautiful Villages of France) Association. Roussillon lies within the borders of the Natural Regional Park of Luberon. In the French natural regional parks system, new economic activities may be developed only if they are sustainable.

It is noted for its large ochre deposits found in the clay surrounding the village. Ochres are pigments ranging from yellow and orange to red. One of the former ochre quarries can be visited via the "Sentier des Ocres" (Ochre Path), a walk of either 30 or 60 minutes through the old workings.

== Geography ==
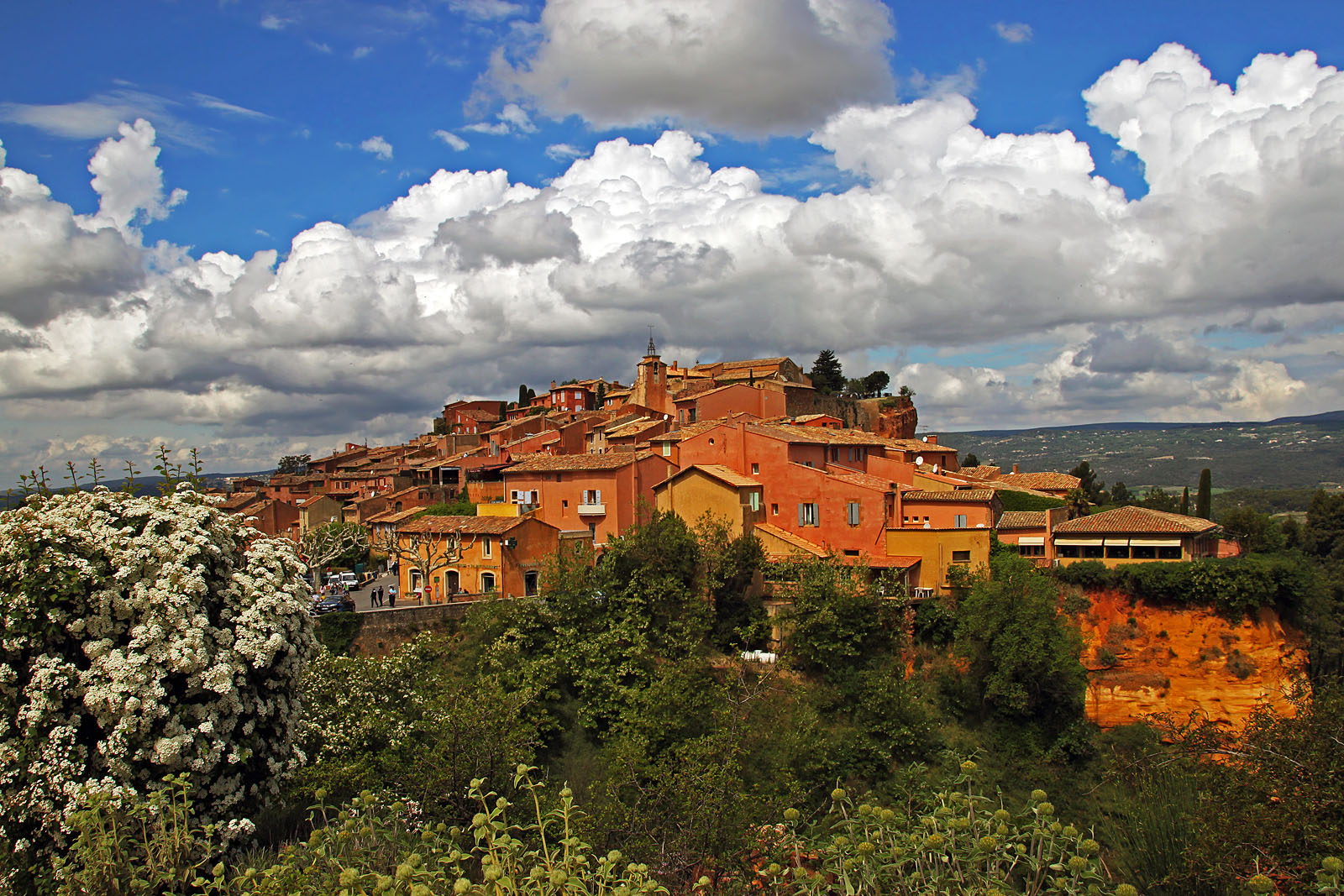
Roussillon from the SE

The village stands on an ochre ridge, situated in a broad valley with the "Monts du Vaucluse" to the north and the "Petit" Luberon to the south. The nearest railway station is in Cavaillon; the nearest TGV station is in Avignon.

The river Calavon forms part of the commune's southern border.

== Geology ==
Roussillon is famous for the rich deposits of ochre pigments found in the clay near the village. The large quarries of Roussillon were mined from the end of the 18th century until 1930. Thousands of people found work in the quarries and factories. Nowadays the mining of ochre is prohibited here, in order to protect the sites from degradation or even complete destruction.

== Mining ochre ==
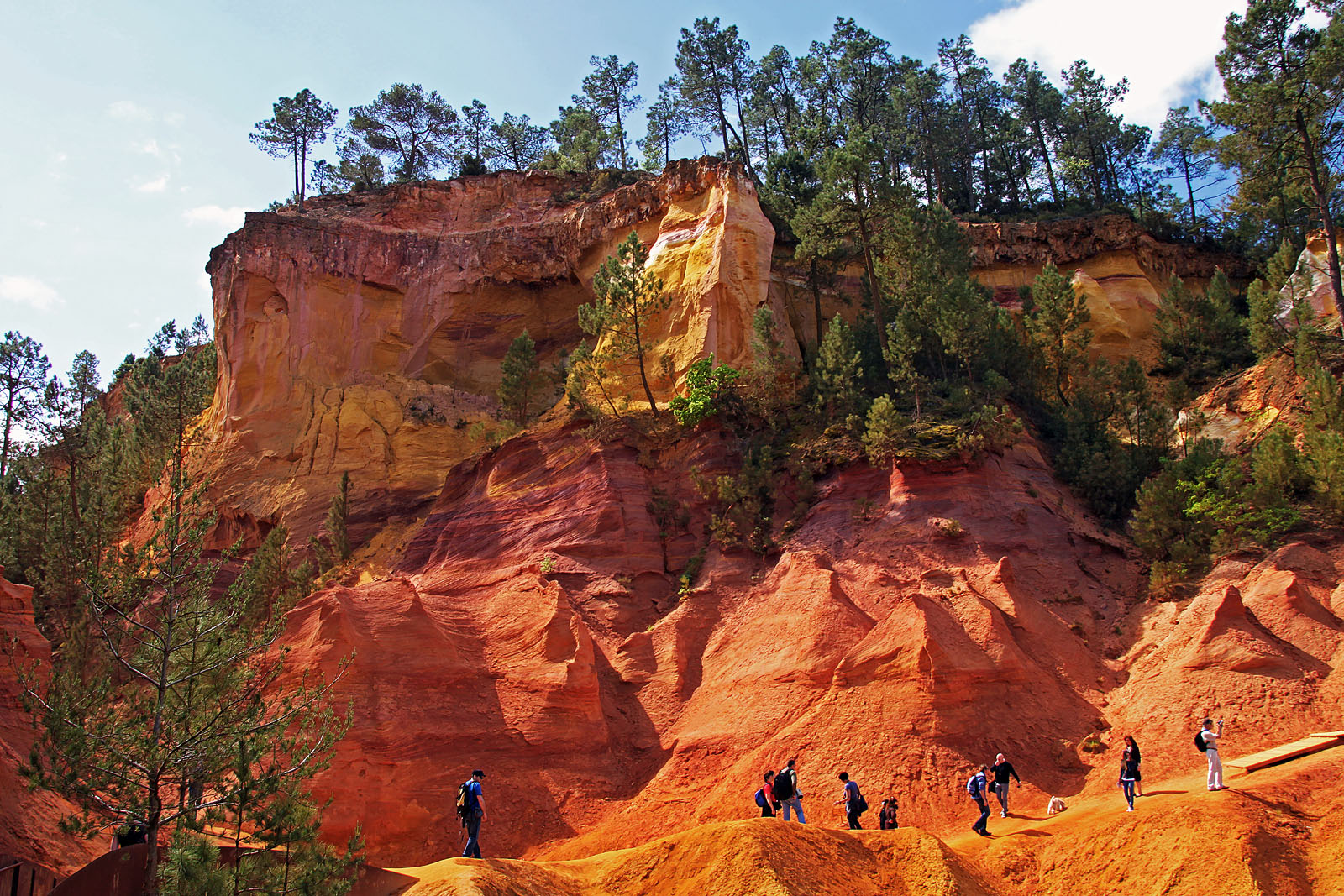
The ochre of Roussillon

During the 18th century, increasing demand for pigments in the textile industry led to intensified mining of ochres in Roussillon. Numerous quarries and ochre factories, some of which can still be seen today, were situated near the village. One example of an ochre factory, the "Usine Mathieu", is named for the family that owned it from 1870 to 1901. It has been formed into a "Conservatoire": a workshop serving as a museum. The quarries and factories were established in the villages of Roussillon, Villars, Gargas, Rustrel (with its Colorado provençal) and Gignac.

During the 20th century, mining techniques were modernized, which meant that more profitable ochre mines became exploitable. This resulted in a gradual closing-down of ochre mines in and around Roussillon. From the 1980s, tourism has replaced the ochre industry as a source of income.

== Agriculture ==
Apart from tourism, agriculture is the commune's principal activity. Fruit, including cherries, peaches and melons are grown. Much of this is used in crystallized fruit production in nearby Apt. Wine-making is very important and there are several wineries producing red, rosé, and white wines within the Ventoux AOC.

== Literary and other cultural references ==
The Irish writer Samuel Beckett went into hiding from the Nazis in Roussillon during the years 1942–1945. His novel Watt was written there, and Beckett mentioned the village in his famous play Waiting for Godot (En attendant Godot) (1955).

Film director Henri Colpi shot this movie Heureux qui comme Ulysse (1970) with Fernandel as the leading character in Roussillon; Georges Brassens wrote a chanson for the film.

Under the name of Peyrane, Roussillon is the subject of Laurence Wylie, Village in the Vaucluse (first edition 1957.)

Roussillon is the setting of Susan Vreeland's 2015 novel, Lisette's List, about a young couple who move from Paris to Roussillon in 1937 to live with the husband's aging grandfather, an ochre miner and pigment salesman, who owns several post-impressionist paintings.

The village gave its name to a Michelin-starred restaurant in London.

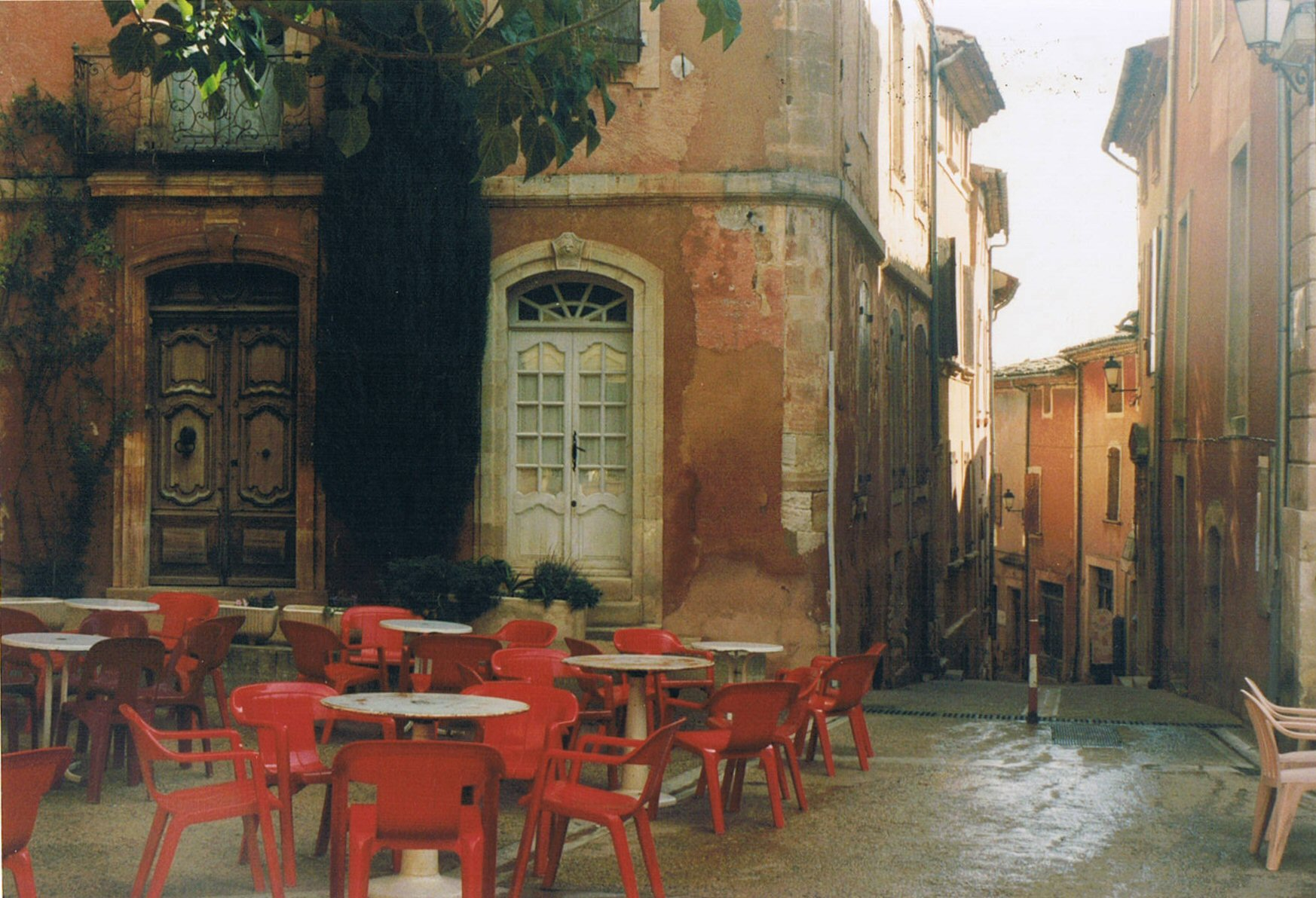
Roussillon in 1993

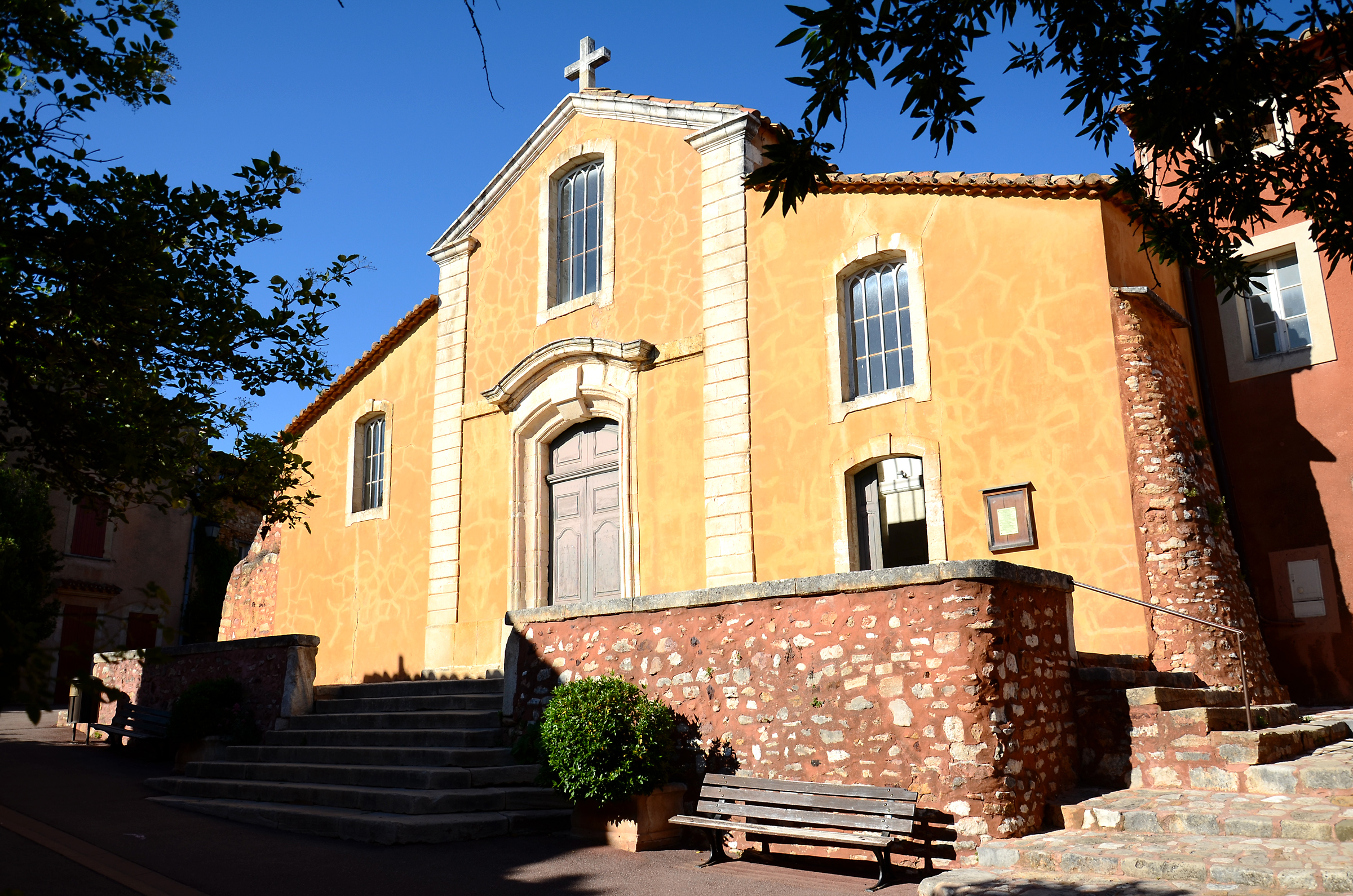
The Church of Roussillon

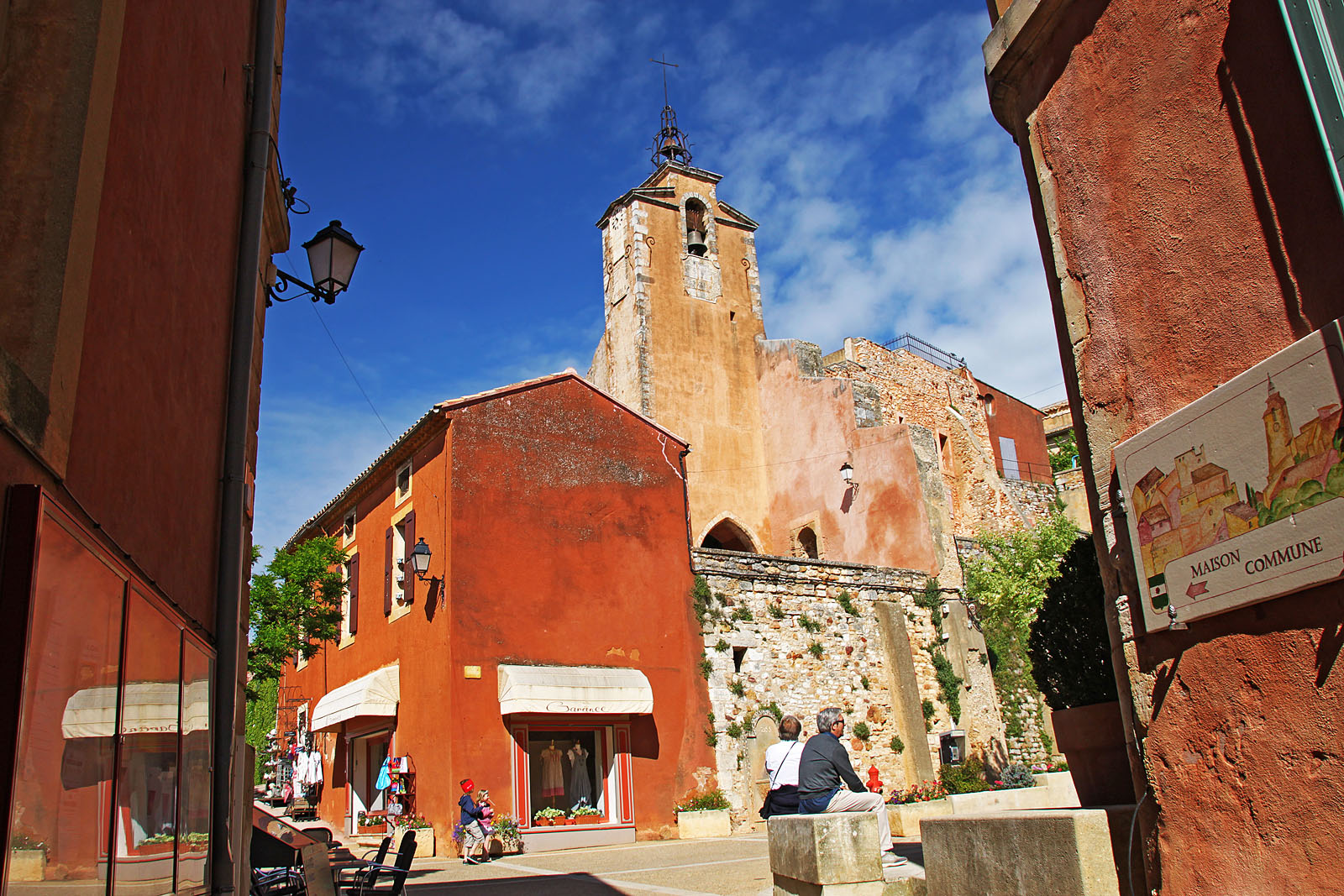
Église Saint-Michel

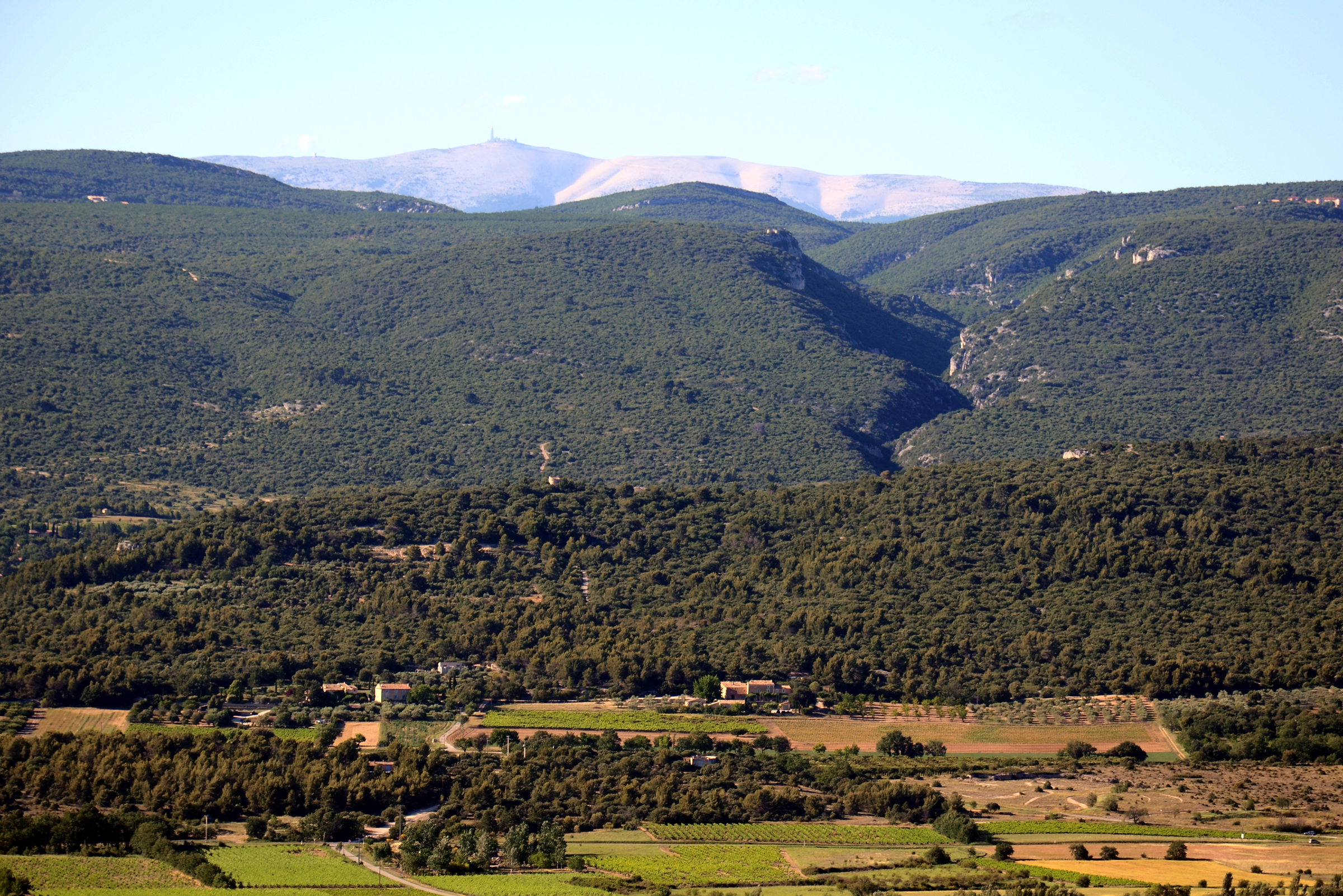
Mont Ventoux seen from Roussillon

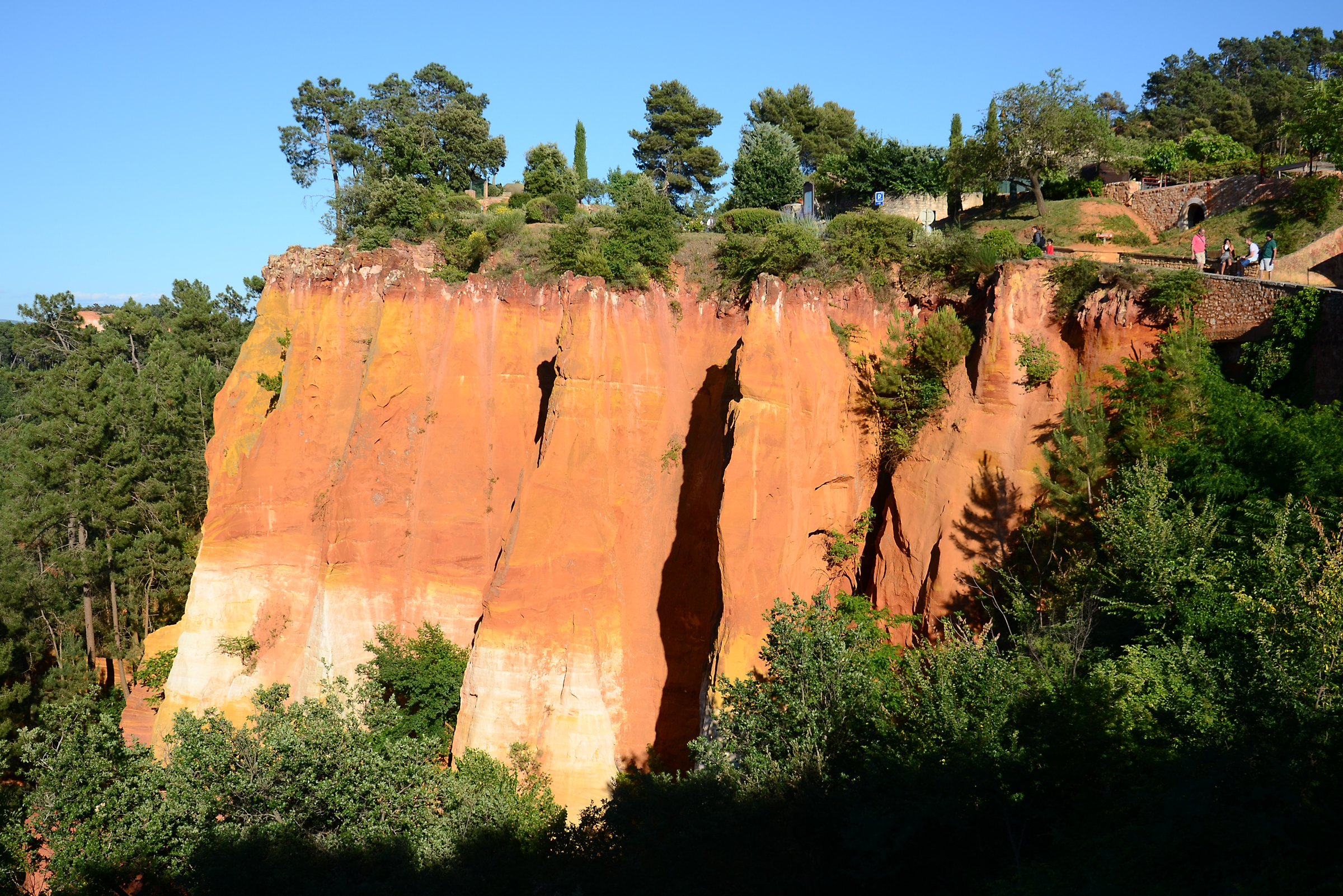
Ochre rocks in Roussillon

== Demography ==
Historical population
Year	Pop.	±% p.a.
1968	827	—
1975	1,093	+4.06%
1982	1,313	+2.65%
1990	1,165	−1.48%
1999	1,161	−0.04%
2007	1,280	+1.23%
2012	1,318	+0.59%
2017	1,305	−0.20%
2023	1,333	+0.35%
Source: INSEE

== See also ==
- Communes of the Vaucluse department
