= Sivergues =

- Commune
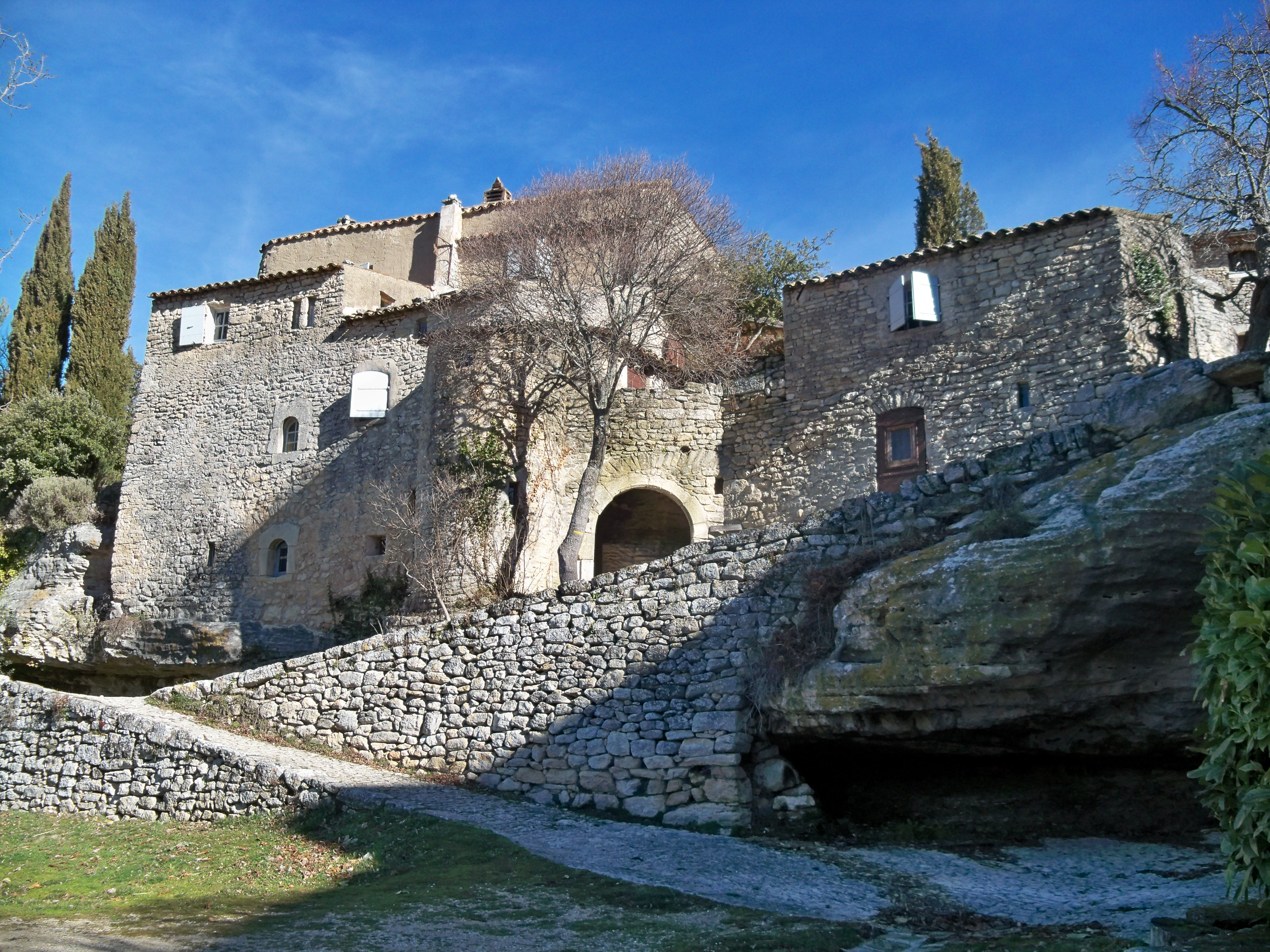
- Buildings in Sivergues

- Coat of arms
- Location of Sivergues
- Location within France Location within Provence-Alpes-Côte d'Azur
- Coordinates: 43°49′45″N 5°24′13″E
- Country: France
- Region: Provence-Alpes-Côte d'Azur
- Department: Vaucluse
- Arrondissement: Apt
- Canton: Apt

Government
  - Mayor (2020–2026): Martine Calas
- Area^{1}: 9.39 km^{2} (3.63 sq mi)
- Elevation: 597 m (1,959 ft)
- Highest elevation: 993 m (3,258 ft)
- Lowest elevation: 430 m (1,410 ft)
- Population (2023): 39
  - Density: 4.2/km^{2} (11/sq mi)
- Time zone: UTC+01:00 (CET)
  - Summer (DST): UTC+02:00 (CEST)
- INSEE/Postal code: 84128 /84400
- ^{1} French Land Register data, which excludes lakes, ponds, glaciers > 1 km^{2} (0.386 sq mi or 247 acres) and river estuaries.

Sivergues (French pronunciation: [sivɛʁg]; Occitan: Civèrgas) is a commune in the Vaucluse department in the Provence-Alpes-Côte d'Azur region in southeastern France.

== See also ==
- Communes of the Vaucluse department
