= Le Beaucet =

- Commune
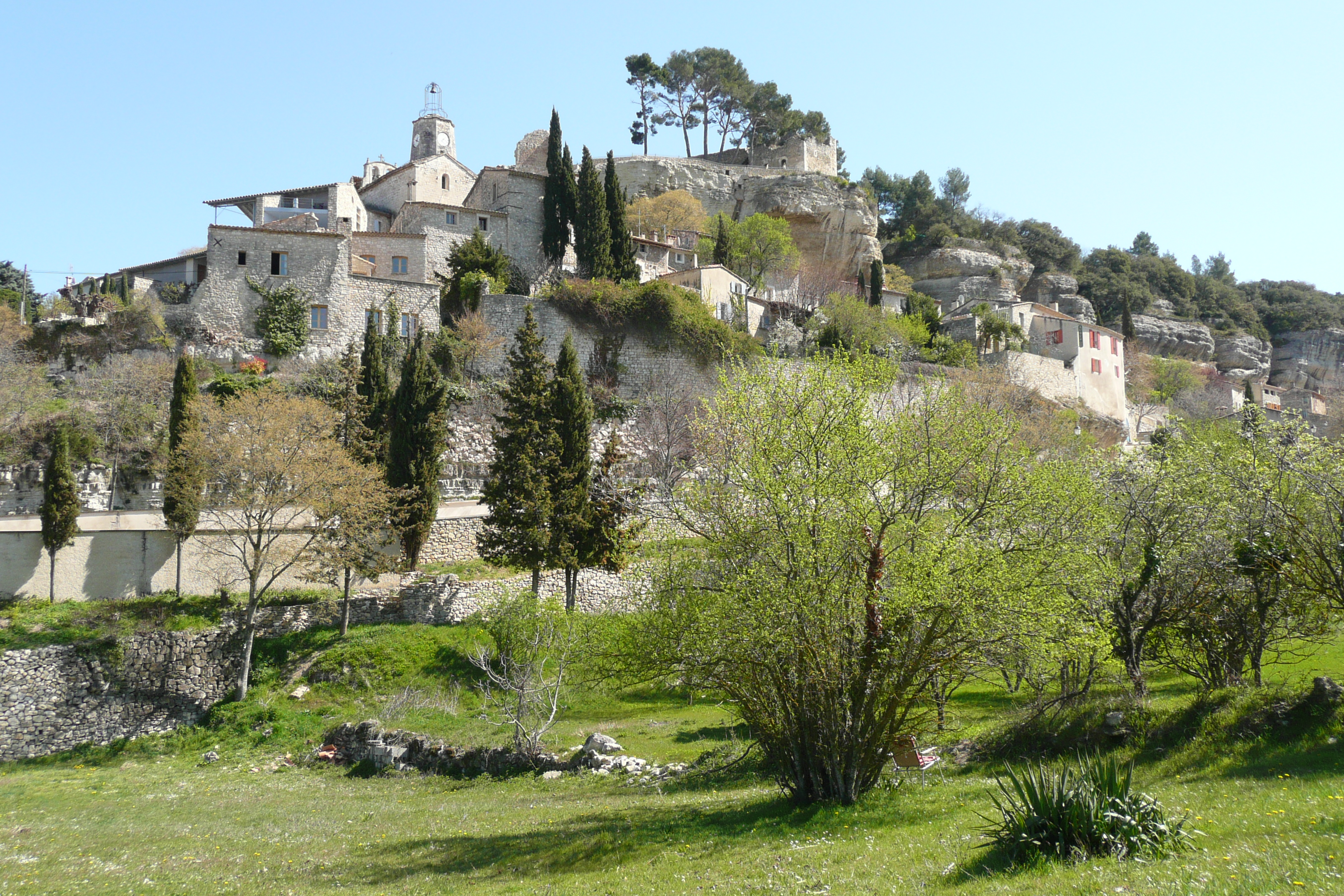
- View of Le Beaucet

- Coat of arms
- Location of Le Beaucet
- Location within France Location within Provence-Alpes-Côte d'Azur
- Coordinates: 43°59′05″N 5°07′13″E
- Country: France
- Region: Provence-Alpes-Côte d'Azur
- Department: Vaucluse
- Arrondissement: Carpentras
- Canton: Pernes-les-Fontaines
- Intercommunality: CA Ventoux-Comtat Venaissin

Government
  - Mayor (2020–2026): François Ille
- Area^{1}: 9.04 km^{2} (3.49 sq mi)
- Elevation: 245 m (804 ft)
- Highest elevation: 665 m (2,182 ft)
- Lowest elevation: 169 m (554 ft)
- Population (2023): 397
  - Density: 43.9/km^{2} (114/sq mi)
- Time zone: UTC+01:00 (CET)
  - Summer (DST): UTC+02:00 (CEST)
- INSEE/Postal code: 84011 /84210
- ^{1} French Land Register data, which excludes lakes, ponds, glaciers > 1 km^{2} (0.386 sq mi or 247 acres) and river estuaries.

Le Beaucet (French pronunciation: [lə bosɛ]; Occitan: Lo Baucet) is a commune in the Vaucluse department in the Provence-Alpes-Côte d'Azur region in southeastern France. The village is located southeast of Carpentras, at the western end of the Monts de Vaucluse.

== See also ==
- Communes of the Vaucluse department
