= Goult =

Goult Gòud (Occitan)
- Commune
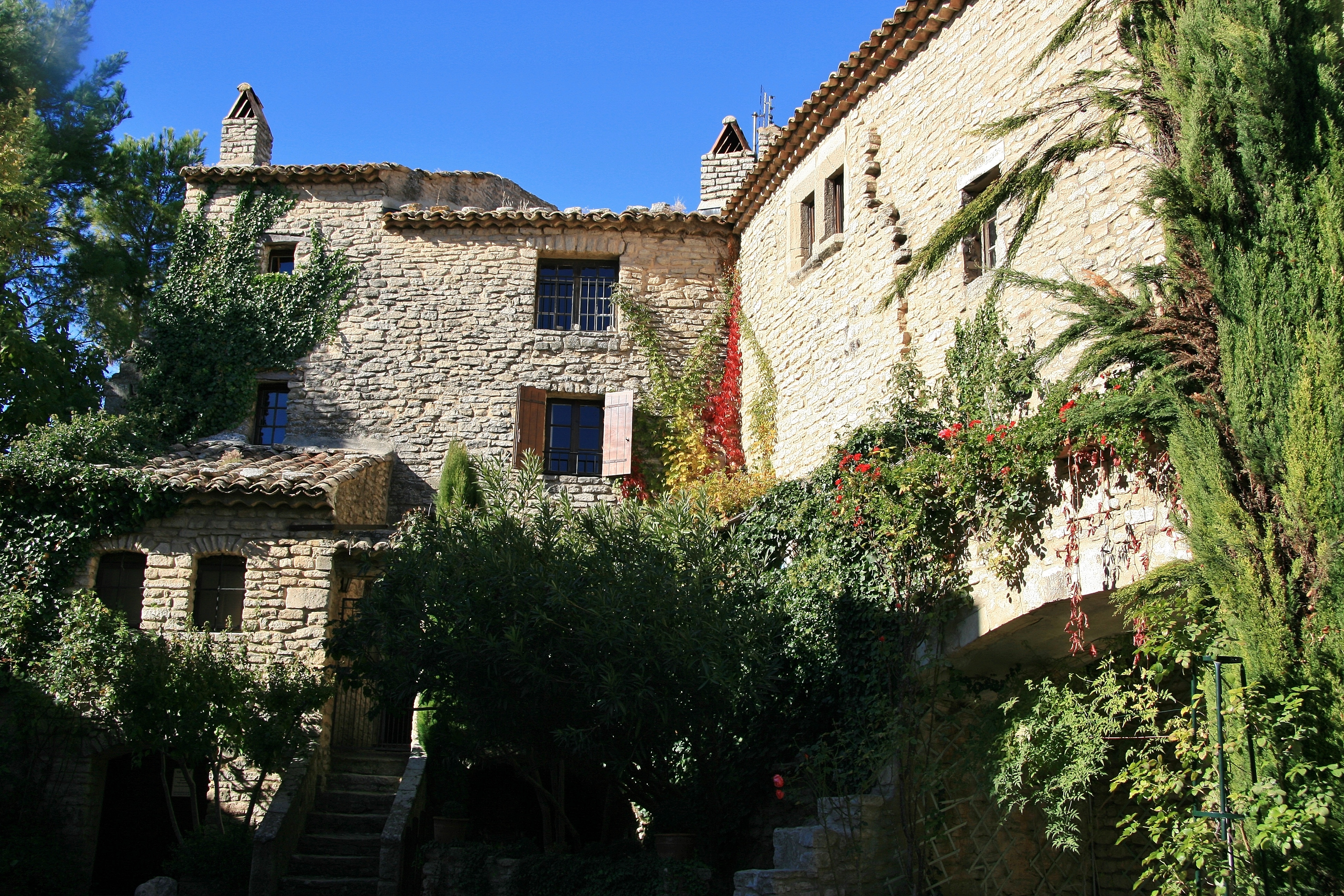
- Village centre

- Coat of arms
- Location of Goult
- Location within France Location within Provence-Alpes-Côte d'Azur
- Coordinates: 43°51′50″N 5°14′39″E
- Country: France
- Region: Provence-Alpes-Côte d'Azur
- Department: Vaucluse
- Arrondissement: Apt
- Canton: Apt

Government
  - Mayor (2020–2026): Didier Perello
- Area^{1}: 23.77 km^{2} (9.18 sq mi)
- Highest elevation: 335 m (1,099 ft)
- Lowest elevation: 121 m (397 ft)
- Population (2023): 1,055
  - Density: 44.38/km^{2} (115.0/sq mi)
- Demonym: Goultois
- Time zone: UTC+01:00 (CET)
  - Summer (DST): UTC+02:00 (CEST)
- INSEE/Postal code: 84051 /84220
- ^{1} French Land Register data, which excludes lakes, ponds, glaciers > 1 km^{2} (0.386 sq mi or 247 acres) and river estuaries.

Goult (French pronunciation: [ɡult]; Occitan: Gòud) is a commune in the Vaucluse department in the Provence-Alpes-Côte d'Azur region in Southeastern France. As of 2023, the population of the commune was 1,055. The village is perched on a hill with a solitary road to the peak. Near the end of the road is a 12th-century castle, the Château de Goult.

== History ==
=== Prehistory and Antiquity ===
Arrowheads, polished axes, and grooved mallets found around Coulet Rouge attest to the presence of Neolithic people in the area of the current commune. During this period, significant agricultural development took place along the banks of the Calavon River. Specialists have linked these settlements to the Lagozza culture after the discovery of a large fragment of an anthropomorphic stele depicting a face with two noses and three eyes, likely representing a deity. On the left bank of the Calavon, the second dolmen in the department was discovered. Known as the Dolmen de l’Ubac, it was excavated between 1995 and 2001.

Judging by the Gallo-Roman remains unearthed (an altar to the Nymphs and Silvanus, urns, pottery, lamps, and glass objects), a villa likely occupied the site.

=== Early Middle Ages ===
The first lord of Goult was Guillaume, who settled on a domain that had belonged to Fouquier/Foucher de Valensole. This son of Humbert de Caseneuve took the name of his fief, Agoldi (castrum Agoldi, 1031). The new lord built a sanctuary dedicated to Saint-Michel, as in 1084, Pope Gregory VII referred to it in one of his bulls as "in Episcopatu Cavalicensis, cellam S. Michaelis in balma Agoldi." This chapel (over-restored and poorly restored) is located in the upper part of the Notre-Dame de Lumières park. Nearby, under the cliff, lies a collapsed borie where a rock-cut wine vat and its press can be seen.

=== Late Middle Ages ===
In the 12th century, the fief of Goult was claimed by Guillaume de Sabran, the new Count of Forcalquier, from his cousin Alphonso of Aragon, Count of Provence. This demand followed the marriage in 1193 of Gersende de Sabran and Alphonse II of Aragon, which aimed to unite the counties of Provence and Forcalquier.

It was during this period that Saint-Pierre, the village church, was built, with its gable wall adorned with a bovine head, and Saint-Véran, dedicated to the Bishop of Cavaillon.

The 13th century saw the confirmation of this lordship to the Agoult family through an act by Raymond Béranger V, Count of Provence, in 1224, before it passed by marriage in 1284 to Bertrand des Baux. In 1301, he granted his villagers the right to appoint four syndics. Three-quarters of a century later, his descendant François des Baux, in rebellion against Queen Jeanne, had this fief confiscated along with all his Provençal possessions. During this period, the village's name evolved from Agoldo (1277) to Agouto, which was used from 1311 to 1526.

Pierre de Sault (?-before 1356), bailiff of Sisteron (1355), was a jurist, knight, native of Aix, and lord of Goult. He appeared in Aix following his marriage to Jacobée, daughter of the wealthy Aixois draper François Mensure. One of his daughters, Philippa, married the knight Blacas de Beaudinard, and another married the master rational Raymond de Crota.

In the 14th century, a significant glassmaking industry emerged. The quality of its products earned it the protection of King René.

=== Renaissance ===
The 15th and 16th centuries were marked by a succession of lords. First, the Agoult-Simiane family returned, then the fief passed to the Sade family, and finally to the Donis family of Florentine origin.

These last two families clashed with the reformers of the Calavon Valley.

Between 1528 and 1533, Paul de Sade became the enforcer of the infamous inquisitor Jean de Roma, appointed by Clement VII to eradicate the Waldensians from the Calavon Valley and Luberon. Both men gained a reputation as butchers.

In 1563, the Donis had to defend their lordship against an incursion by Huguenots from Valmasque, between Bonnieux and Ménerbes. It was around this time—circa 1538—that the habit of eliding the "A" from Agoult began, and the village came to be called Goult.

=== Modern Period ===
In 1659, at the request of Jean-Baptiste Donis, Louis XIV elevated his land of Beauchamp to a marquisate.

The commune's territory was governed by several castles. The oldest and highest was that of Babilony, above Bon Repos, built in the 13th century and completely restored by the Donis family in 1805. The Château de Maricamp, used as a seigneurial residence in the 18th century, adjoins the Via Domitia (R.N. 100).

=== Contemporary Period ===
In reaction to the coup d'état of December 2, 1851, by Louis-Napoléon Bonaparte, the republicans of Luberon and the Apt region rose up. On Monday, December 8, 1851, the insurgent column that left Apt in the morning stopped in the commune of Goult, at the hamlet of Lumières. Earlier, a detachment of one hundred and fifty insurgents presented themselves to Mayor Demarre to requisition the guns of the national guard. Auguste Saunier and Frédéric Carbonnel, president of "La Montagne" in Goult, insisted that the mayor hand over the twelve guns stored at the town hall. The mayor, a "defender of order," opposed the Montagnards of Goult, who questioned the legitimacy of his authority following the fall of the Republic. The conservative mayor defended himself, deferring to the decisions of the Bonapartist authority, which was illegal under the 1848 Constitution. The Montagnards of Goult who joined the insurgent column included Pharon Combe, Adrien Molinas, Jean Baptiste Soultzard, Louis Lavigne, Siffroi Eymard, Porte the grocer, Joseph Bremond, Simon Brémond, Joseph Ferdinand Grangier, Camille Granier, Mouret the recruiter for "La Montagne" in Goult, Marius Bouchard, Marius Rey, Lambert Berlinguet, Balthazar Pare, Antoine Louet the farmer, and Henri Granier the café owner, where "La Montagne" regularly met. Joseph Briand, a farmer, declared that "all the notaries' and mortgage registries should be burned". At nightfall, Frédéric Carbonnel, accompanied by two armed men, informed the mayor of Goult that "a very large troop had arrived at Lumières and was waiting for him to issue supply vouchers." The flag bearer displayed a written order signed by Creste and Seymard, demanding the mayor's immediate presence in Lumières. The mayor, under duress, went to Lumières and saw "a troop of about 800 men singing the Marseillaise and shouting 'Long live the Republic.'" With the president deposed, all means were employed to restore the Republic within the framework of the 1848 Constitution. These acts were in no way looting; the insurgents strictly respected persons and property.

The sums owed to innkeepers were settled with vouchers, demonstrating the legal practices of the column's commanders and the clear purpose of the insurrection: to defend the Republic.

The roofs of Goult and Luberon.

In 1970, ethnology students from the University of Provence in Aix-en-Provence, as part of the CERESM program, studied the village from both environmental and matrimonial perspectives.

Goult is defined as a "classic perched village" since it is established on a hilltop at the western end of the Apt basin, overlooking a variety of terrains. The students also noted its evolution through the existence of two squares, Place de l'Ancienne-Poste and Place de la Libération, which reflect the shifting zones of habitation and, consequently, the village's centers.

Not only has the number of marriages not decreased, but it has even tended to increase due to the significant agricultural activity in the area. Moreover, a comparison between 1900 and 1970 showed that the number of marriages contracted beyond a 50 km radius remained stable (1/6 of marriages).

The attractive role is played by Apt and then by areas with significant agricultural development: the cantons of Bollène, Valréas, Bédarrides, Beaumes-de-Venise, L'Isle-sur-la-Sorgue, and Cavaillon. This allowed researchers to explain that these matrimonial unions:

"With the network of alliances and social relations they entail, facilitate the exchange of information and technical, economic, as well as political or cultural innovations. Far from weakening the village social structure, they strengthen or maintain it in step with the evolution of global society".

Conversely, the establishment of second homes occupied by people from Marseille or Paris, or even Anglo-Saxons, Swiss, Belgians, or Germans, has often taken on a conflictual and disruptive character, resulting, in the majority of cases, in a lack of marriage with these outsiders.

== Geography ==
The commune lies within Luberon Regional Natural Park (Parc naturel régional du Luberon), between Cavaillon and Apt, southeast of Gordes.

The Calavon flows westward through the southern part of the commune.

== Places and monuments ==
- Goult castle
- Saint Véran chapel
- Windmill
- Notre Dame des Lumières church
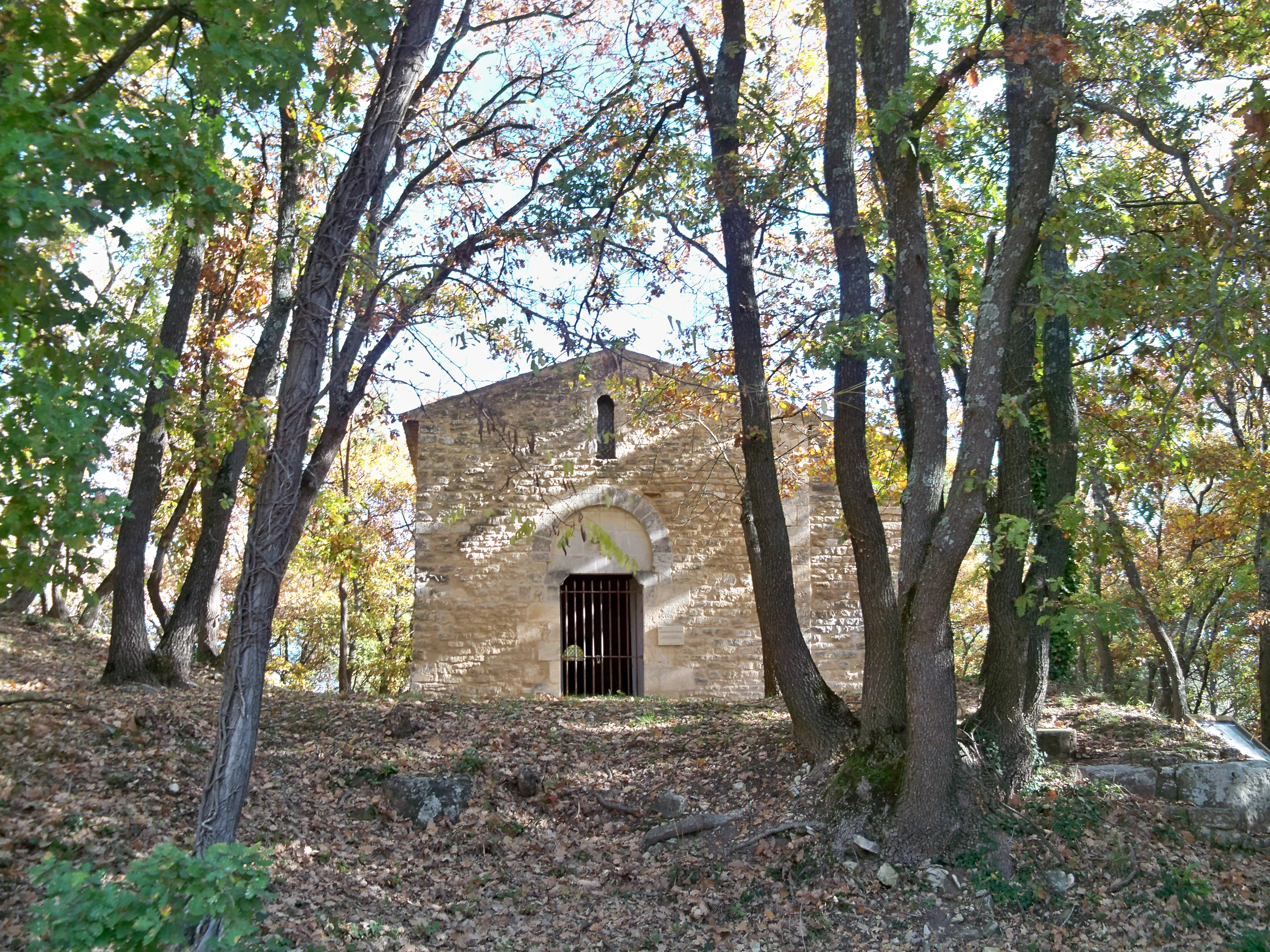
Saint Véran chapel

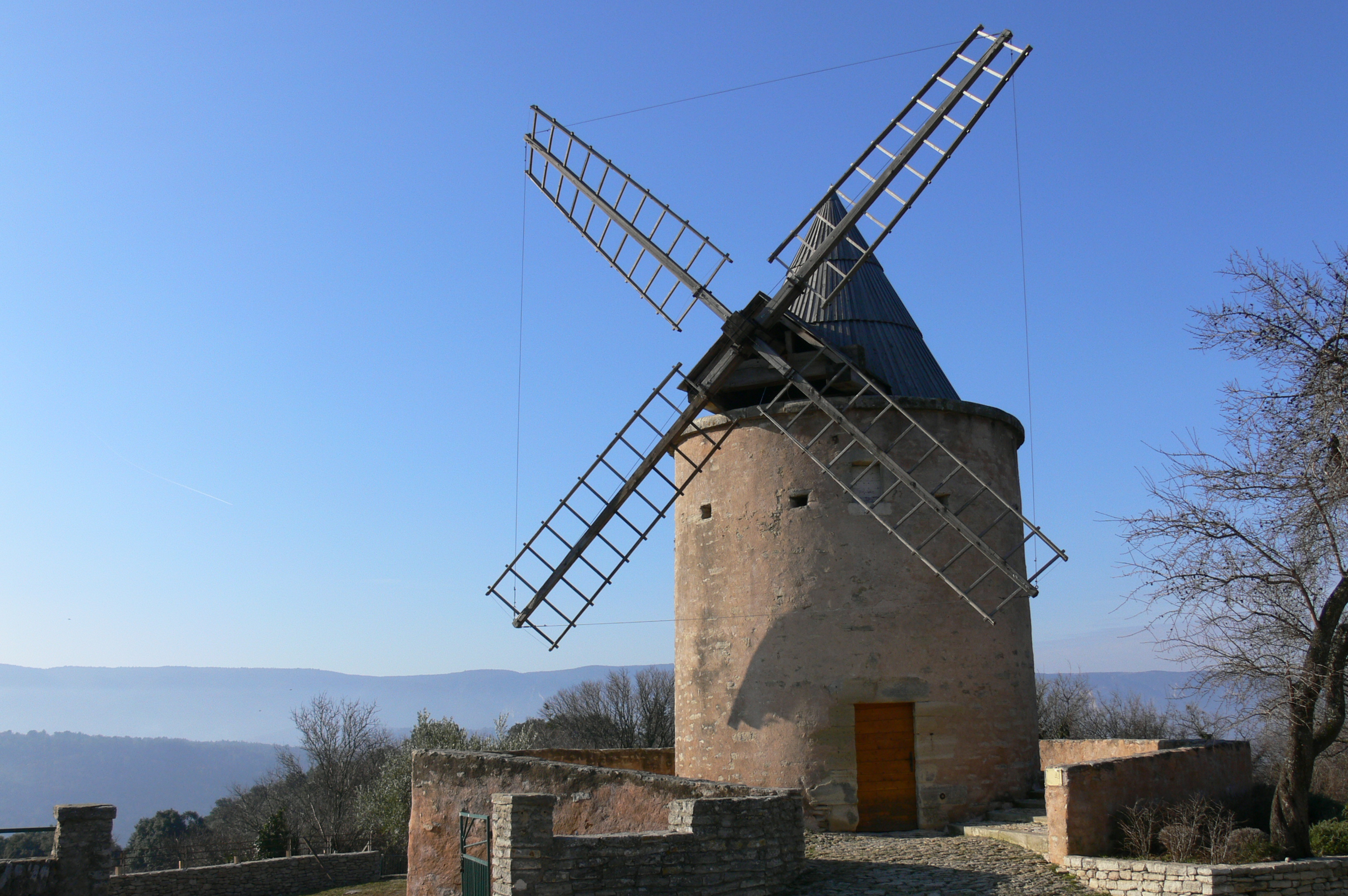
Old windmill

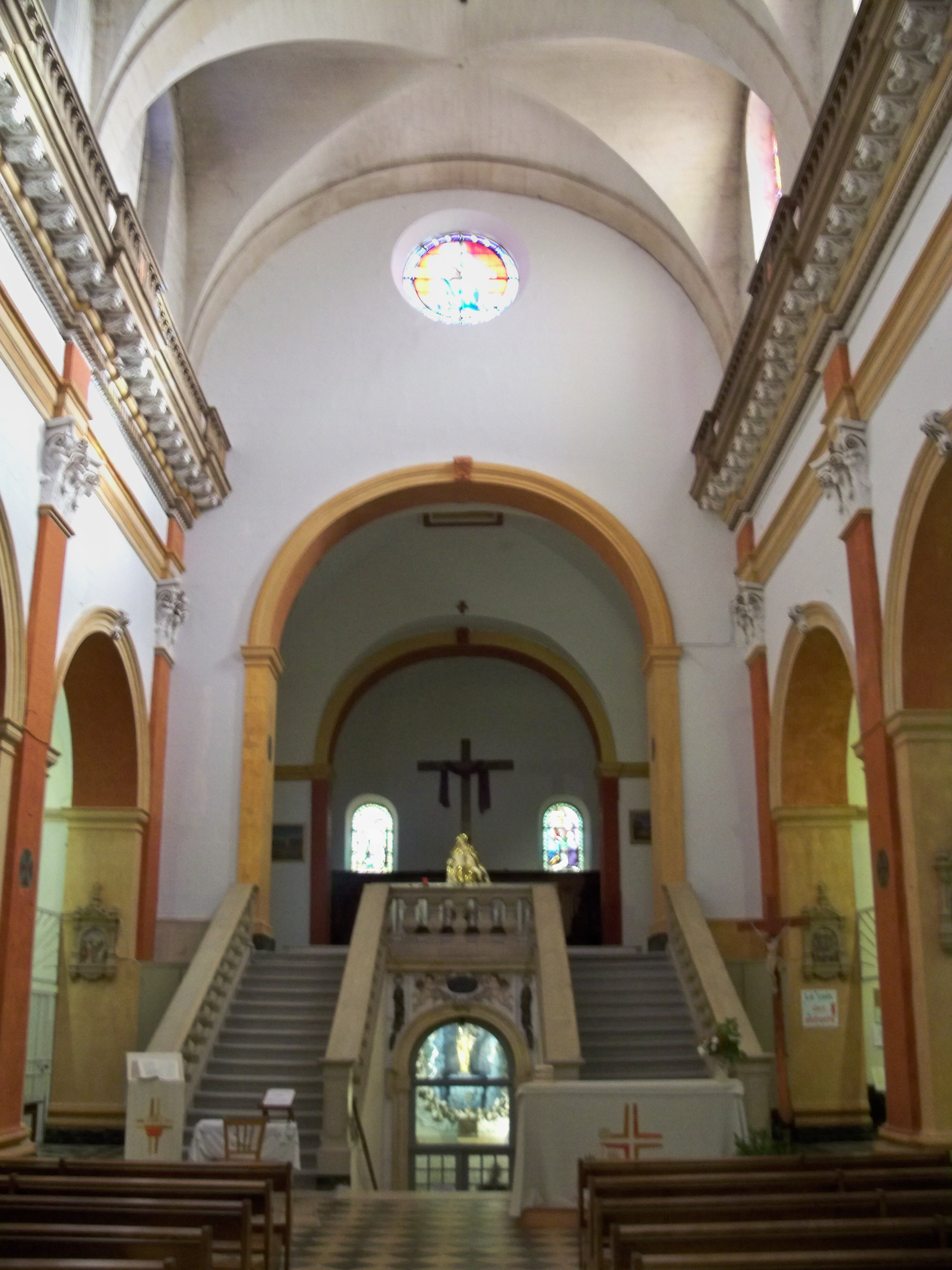
inside Notre Dame des Lumières church

== See also ==
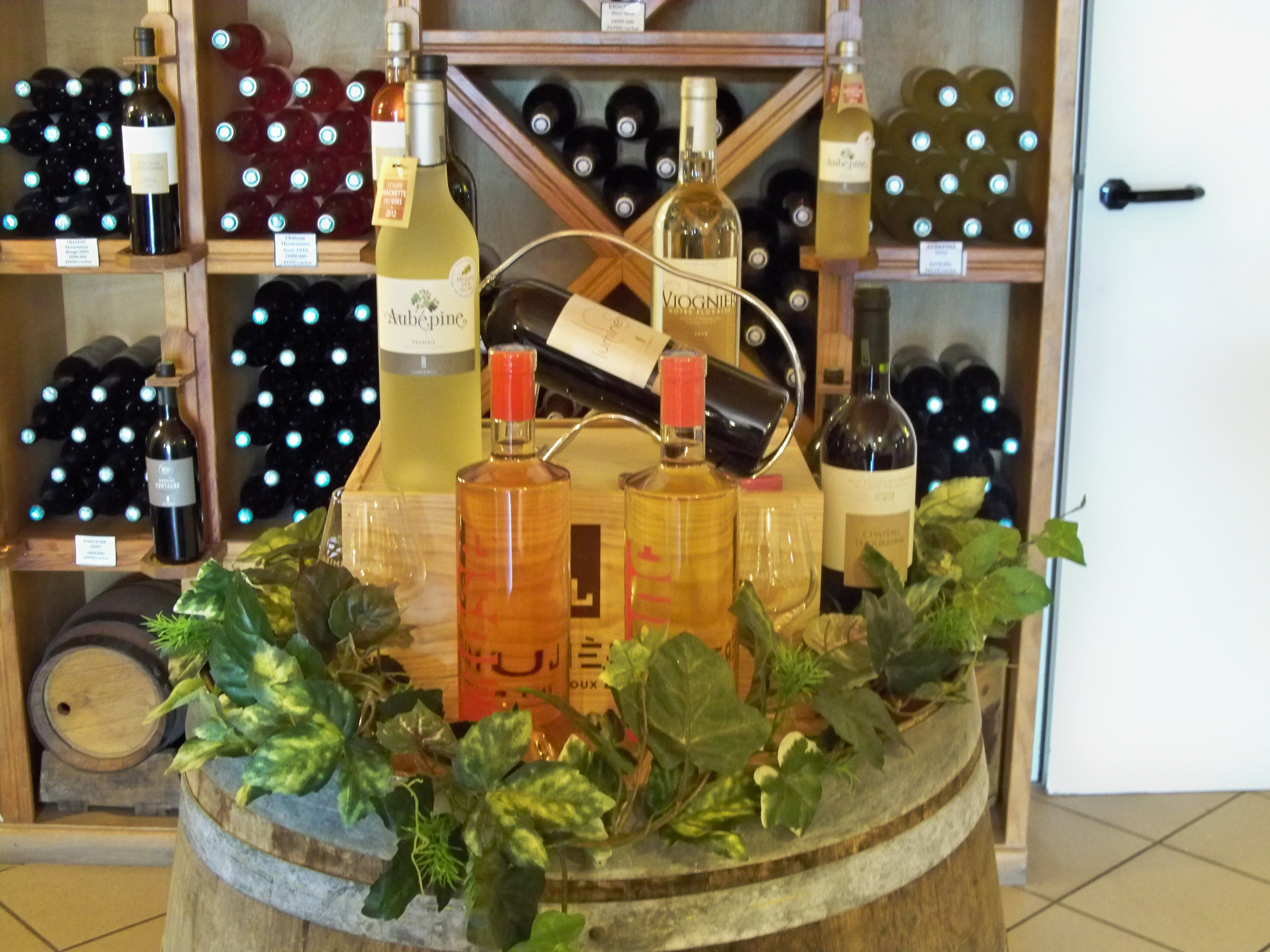
wine bottles product in Lumières, hamlet of Goult

- Luberon
- Côtes de Ventoux AOC
- Côtes du Luberon AOC
- Communes of the Vaucluse department
