= Canton of Apt =

Coordinates: 43°53′50″N 5°27′32″E

Apt
- Canton
- Country: France
- Region: Provence-Alpes-Côte d'Azur
- Department: Vaucluse
- No. of communes: {{{nbcomm}}}
- Area: 677.84 km^{2} (261.72 sq mi)
- Population (2023): 30,326
  - Density: 44.739/km^{2} (115.87/sq mi)
- INSEE code: 84 01

The canton d'Apt is a French administrative division in the department of Vaucluse and region Provence-Alpes-Côte d'Azur.

== Composition ==
At the French canton reorganisation which came into effect in March 2015, the canton was expanded from 13 to 27 communes:

- Apt
- Auribeau
- Beaumettes
- Bonnieux
- Buoux
- Caseneuve
- Castellet-en-Luberon
- Gargas
- Gignac
- Gordes
- Goult
- Joucas
- Lacoste
- Lagarde-d'Apt
- Lioux
- Ménerbes
- Murs
- Oppède
- Roussillon
- Rustrel
- Saignon
- Saint-Martin-de-Castillon
- Saint-Pantaléon
- Saint-Saturnin-lès-Apt
- Sivergues
- Viens
- Villars
