= Joucas =

- Commune
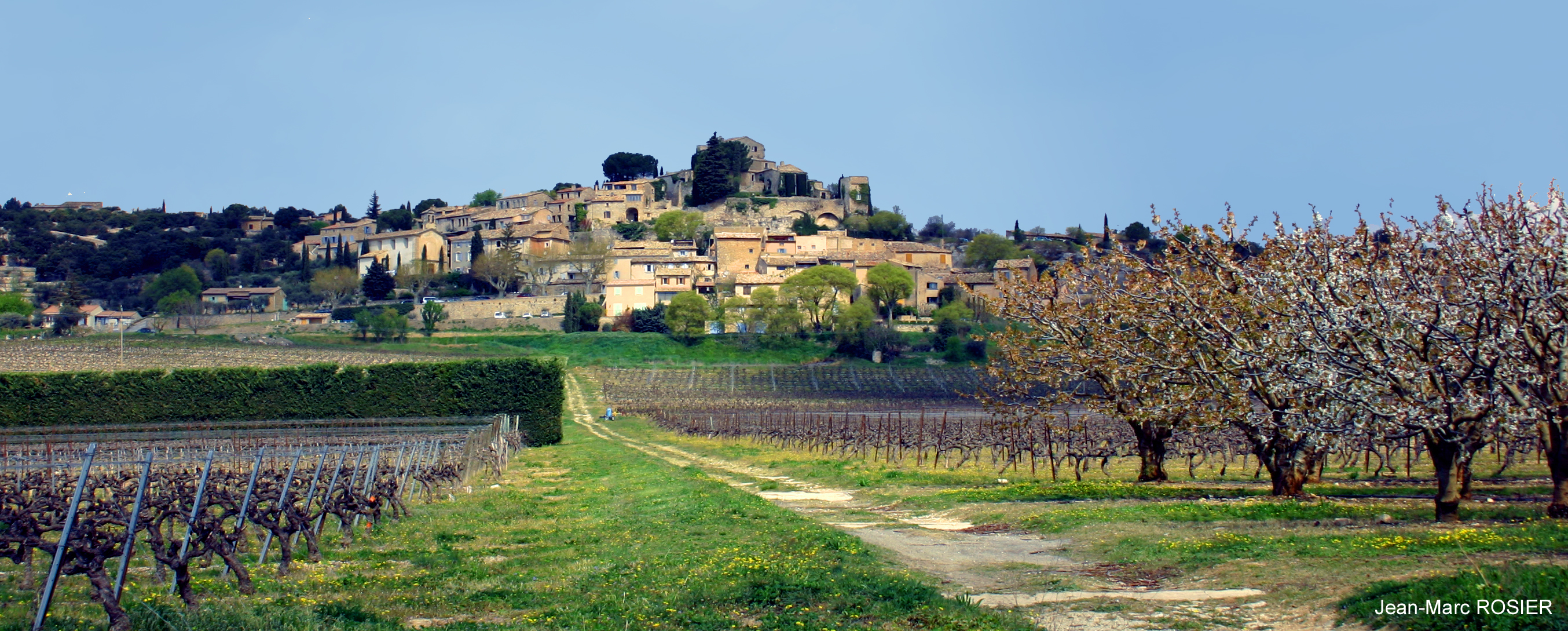
- A general view of the village of Joucas

- Coat of arms
- Location of Joucas
- Location within France Location within Provence-Alpes-Côte d'Azur
- Coordinates: 43°55′36″N 5°15′10″E
- Country: France
- Region: Provence-Alpes-Côte d'Azur
- Department: Vaucluse
- Arrondissement: Apt
- Canton: Apt

Government
  - Mayor (2020–2026): Lucien Aubert
- Area^{1}: 8.29 km^{2} (3.20 sq mi)
- Elevation: 263 m (863 ft)
- Highest elevation: 447 m (1,467 ft)
- Lowest elevation: 178 m (584 ft)
- Population (2023): 348
  - Density: 42.0/km^{2} (109/sq mi)
- Time zone: UTC+01:00 (CET)
  - Summer (DST): UTC+02:00 (CEST)
- INSEE/Postal code: 84057 /84220
- ^{1} French Land Register data, which excludes lakes, ponds, glaciers > 1 km^{2} (0.386 sq mi or 247 acres) and river estuaries.

Joucas (French pronunciation: [ʒukas]; Occitan: Jocaç) is a commune in the Vaucluse department in the Provence-Alpes-Côte d'Azur region in southeastern France. The town is located on the perimeter of the Parc naturel régional du Luberon.

== Geography ==
Located between two of the "most beautiful villages in France," Gordes and Roussillon, Joucas is a small hilltop village of Monts de Vaucluse. From the village one can see the surrounding plain and ochre hills of Roussillon. Like other hilltop villages in the region, the village location was selected in part due to the good views, which allowed inhabitants to see enemies approaching from far away.

== Population ==
Historical population

Year	Pop.	±% p.a.
1793	303	—
1821	308	+0.06%
1846	391	+0.96%
1872	380	−0.11%
1901	219	−1.88%
1926	169	−1.03%
1946	195	+0.72%
1962	163	−1.11%
1968	201	+3.55%

Year	Pop.	±% p.a.
1975	204	+0.21%
1982	210	+0.41%
1990	258	+2.61%
1999	317	+2.31%
2007	315	−0.08%
2012	325	+0.63%
2017	338	+0.79%
2023	348	+0.49%

From the year 1962 on: population without double counting
Source: 1793-1999 EHESS, 1968-2023 INSEE

== Tourism ==
Like all municipalities in the Luberon, tourism plays a role, directly or indirectly, in the local economy. There are several main types of tourism in the Luberon. Historical and cultural tourism relies on the rich heritage of the hilltop villages. Vacation tourism has resulted in the significant development of cottages, hotels and rentals, a large concentration of pools, and activities such as the Provençal markets. Finally, green tourism benefits from the many hiking trails and protected lands in the Luberon and surroundings. Tourism (hotels, guest houses and restaurants, including a starred Michelin) is an important part of the Joucas economy.

== Places to see ==
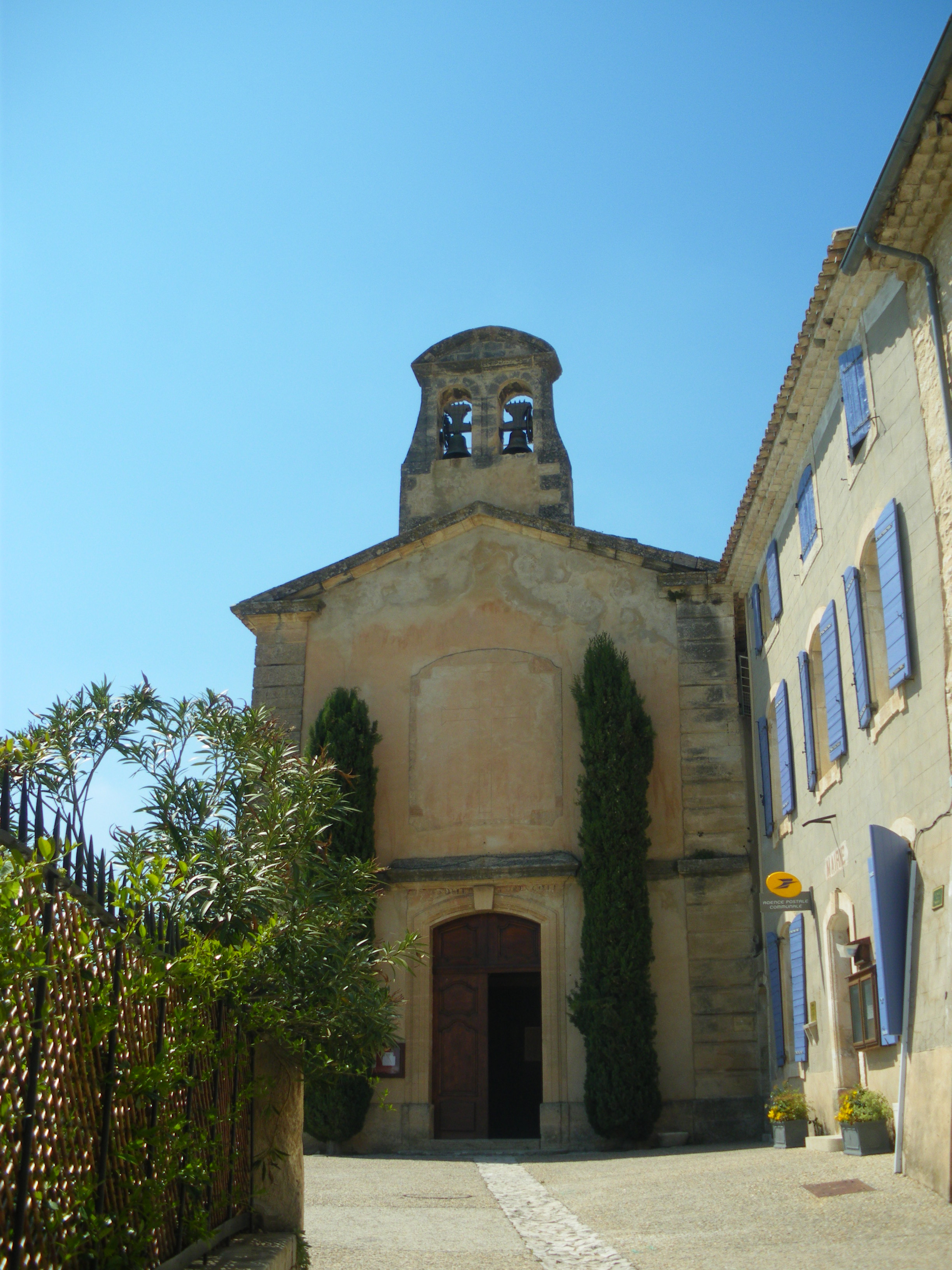
Joucas church

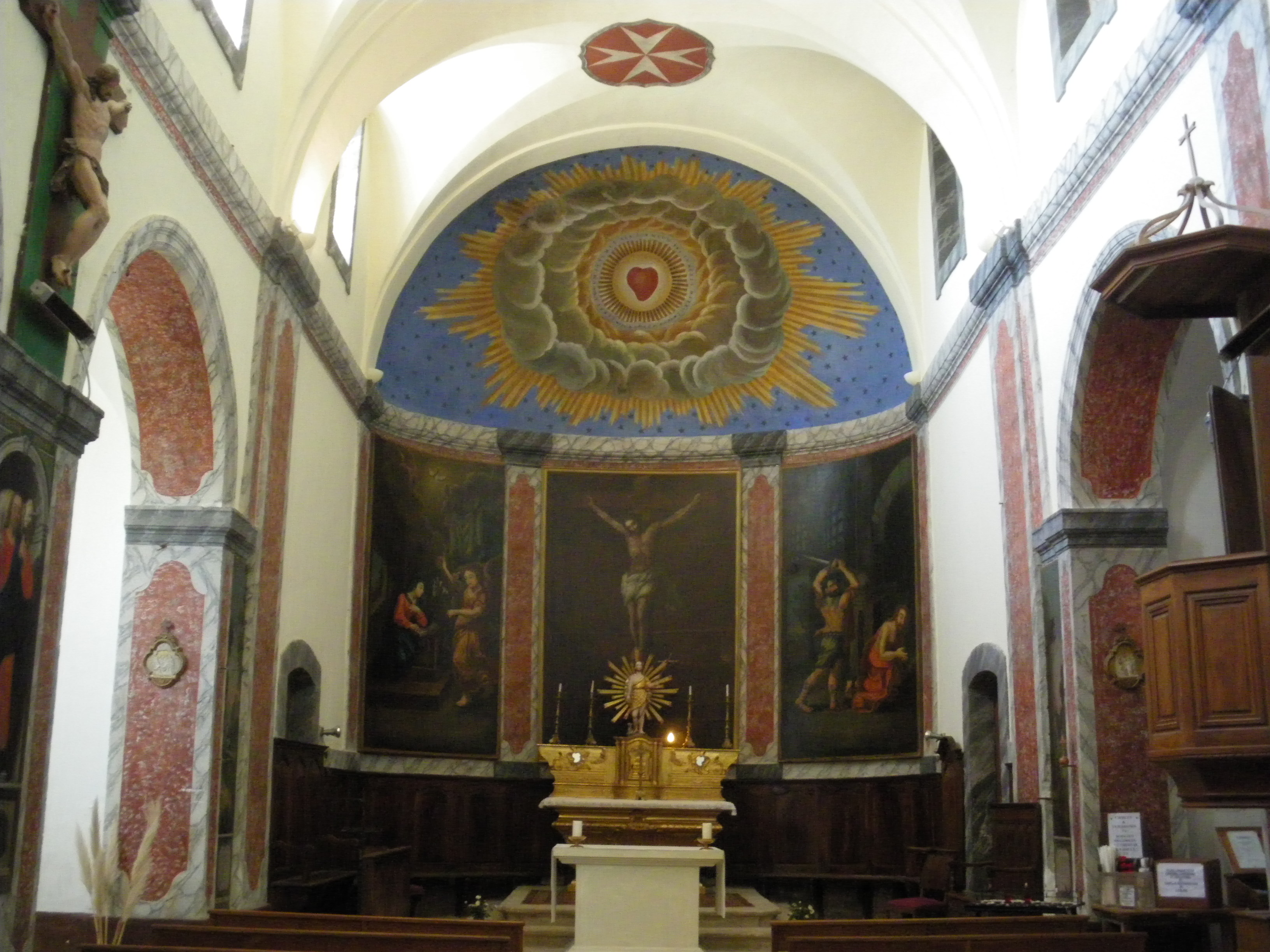
inside the church

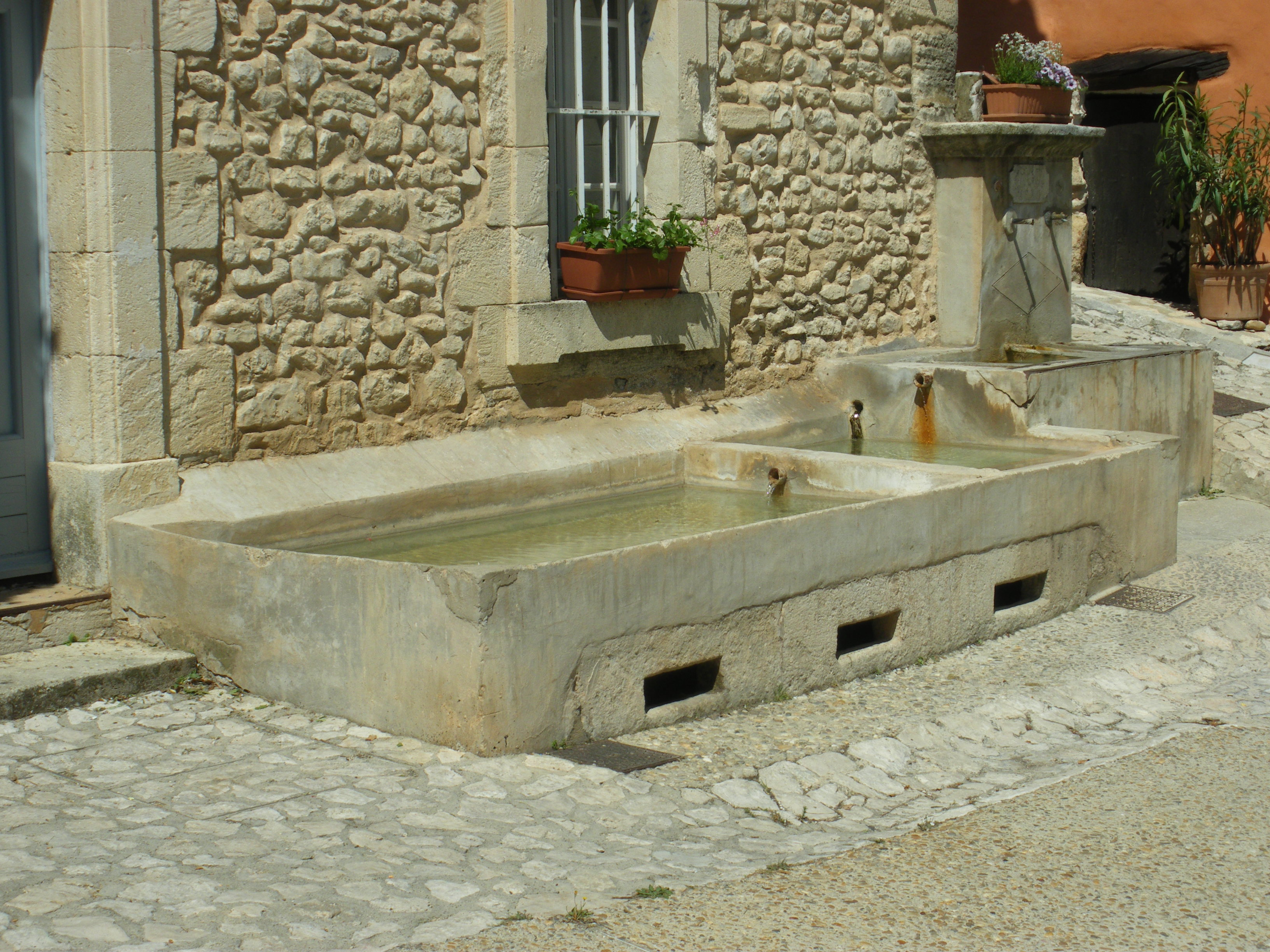
Old wash house

== See also ==
- Communes of the Vaucluse department
- Luberon
