= Saint-Saturnin-lès-Apt =

Saint-Saturnin-lès-Apt Sant Savornin d'Ate (Occitan)
- Commune
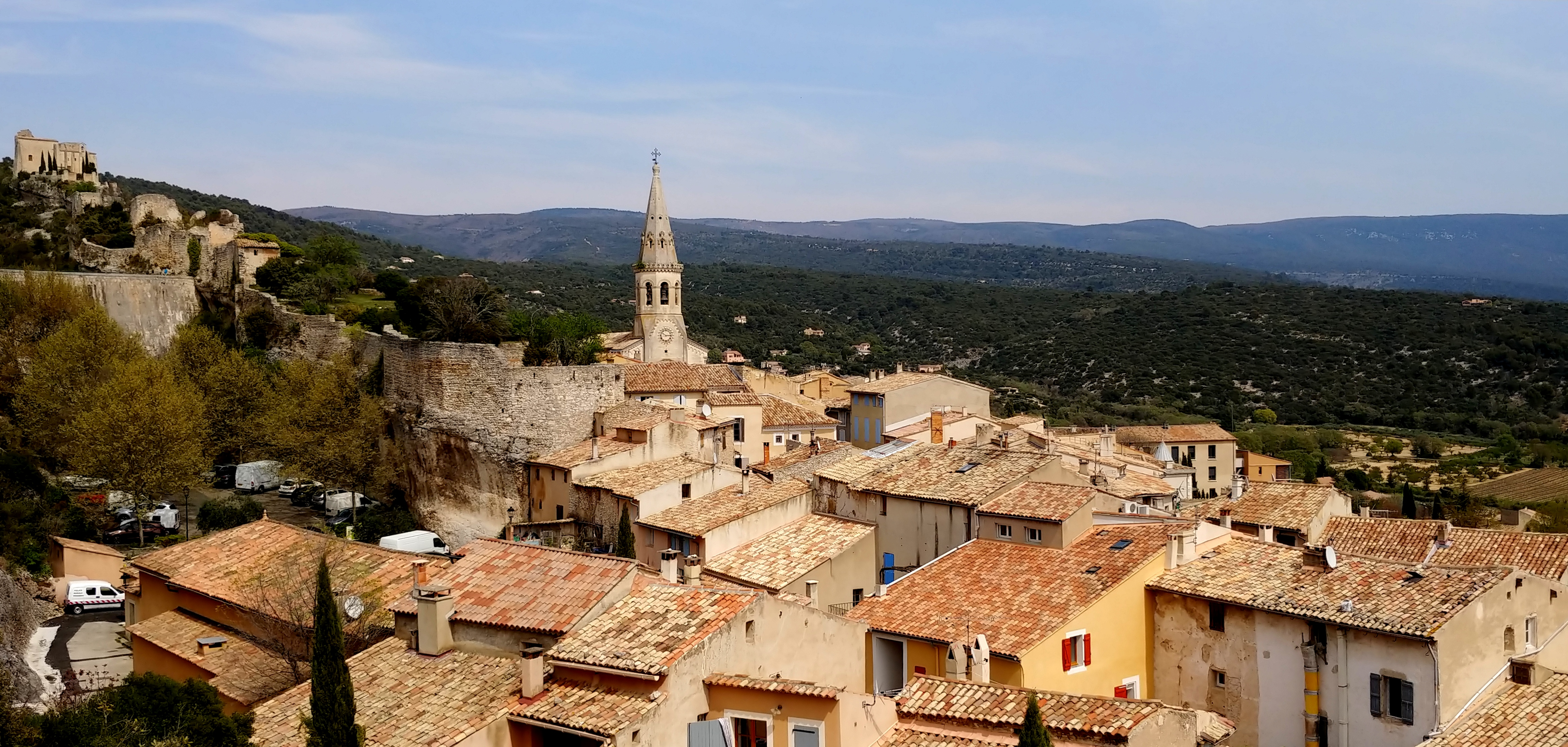
- A view of the village perché, April 2019

- Coat of arms
- Location of Saint-Saturnin-lès-Apt
- Location within France Location within Provence-Alpes-Côte d'Azur
- Coordinates: 43°56′42″N 5°23′04″E
- Country: France
- Region: Provence-Alpes-Côte d'Azur
- Department: Vaucluse
- Arrondissement: Apt
- Canton: Apt
- Intercommunality: CC Pays d'Apt-Luberon

Government
  - Mayor (2020–2026): Christian Bellot
- Area^{1}: 75.79 km^{2} (29.26 sq mi)
- Elevation: 411 m (1,348 ft)
- Highest elevation: 1,093 m (3,586 ft)
- Lowest elevation: 217 m (712 ft)
- Population (2023): 3,004
  - Density: 39.64/km^{2} (102.7/sq mi)
- Demonym: Saturninois
- Time zone: UTC+01:00 (CET)
  - Summer (DST): UTC+02:00 (CEST)
- INSEE/Postal code: 84118 /84490
- Website: www.saintsaturninlesapt.fr
- ^{1} French Land Register data, which excludes lakes, ponds, glaciers > 1 km^{2} (0.386 sq mi or 247 acres) and river estuaries.

Saint-Saturnin-lès-Apt (French pronunciation: [sɛ̃ satyʁnɛ̃ lɛ.z‿apt], lit. "St Saturnin near Apt"; Provençal Occitan: Sant Savornin d'Ate, before 1987: Saint-Saturnin d'Apt) is a commune in the Vaucluse department in the Provence-Alpes-Côte d'Azur region in Southeastern France.

== Population ==
To differentiate the commune's inhabitants from those of Saint-Saturnin-lès-Avignon to the west, the first are called Saturninois (masculine) and Saturninoises (feminine) in French, whereas the latter are called Saint-Saturninois (masculine) and Saint-Saturninoises (feminine).

Historical population
Year	Pop.	±% p.a.
1968	1,212	—
1975	1,430	+2.39%
1982	1,741	+2.85%
1990	2,144	+2.64%
1999	2,341	+0.98%
2007	2,628	+1.46%
2012	2,726	+0.73%
2017	2,811	+0.62%
2023	3,004	+1.11%
Source: INSEE

== Twin towns ==
- Castelfranco di Sopra, Italy

== See also ==
- Communes of the Vaucluse department
- Luberon

== Gallery ==
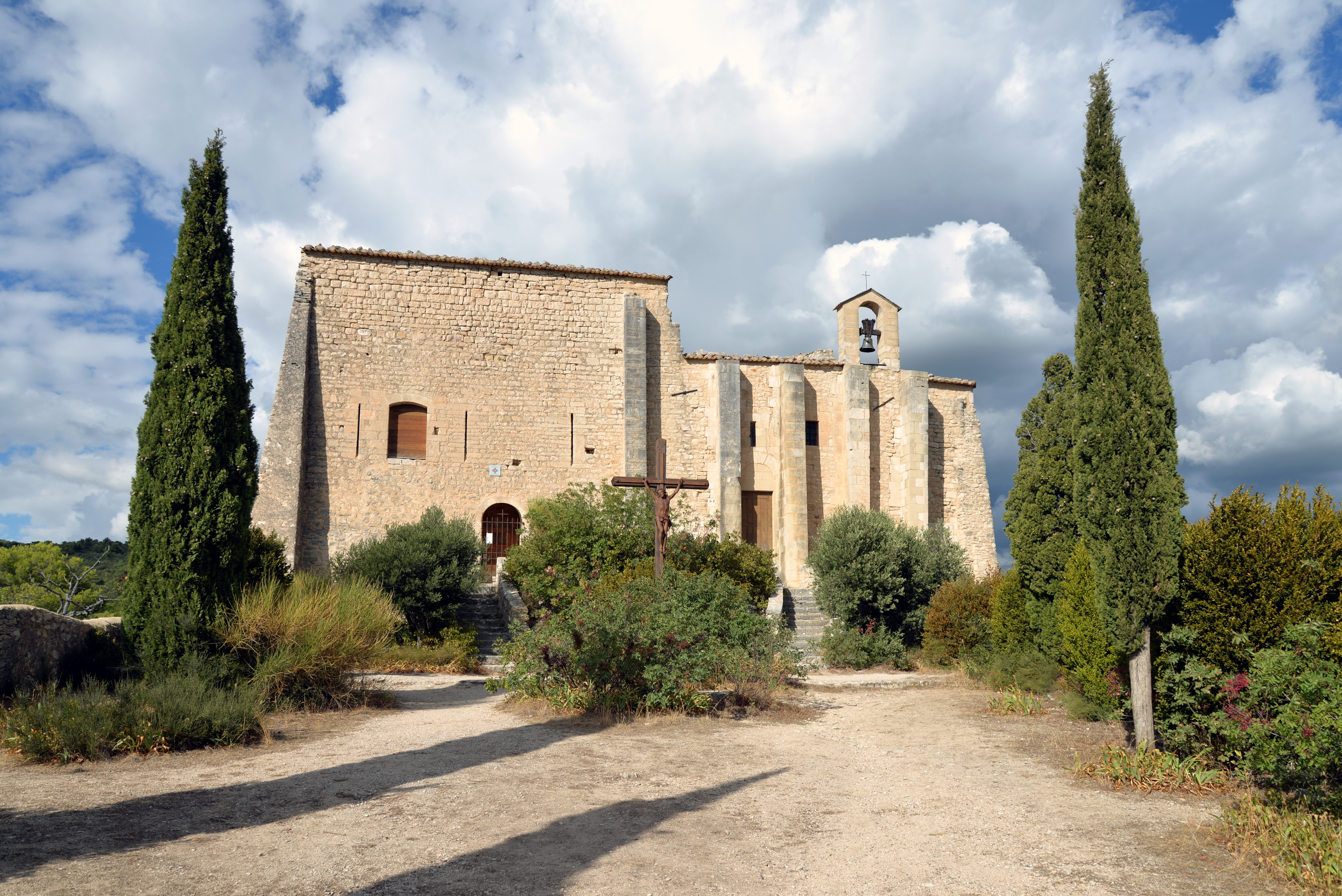
Chapel of the castle of Saint-Saturnin-lès-Apt

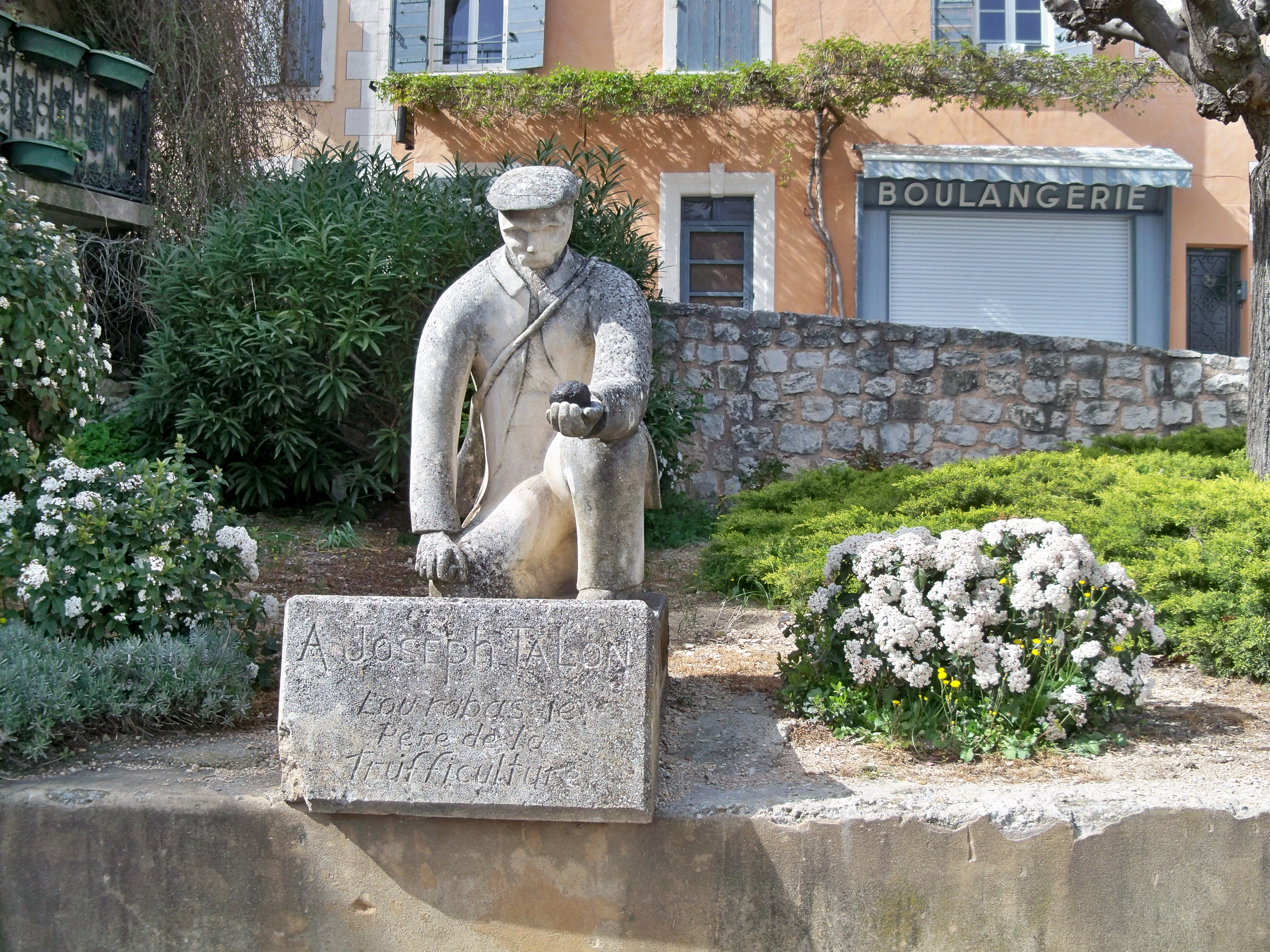
Statue of Joseph Talon, in Saint-Saturnin-lès-Apt

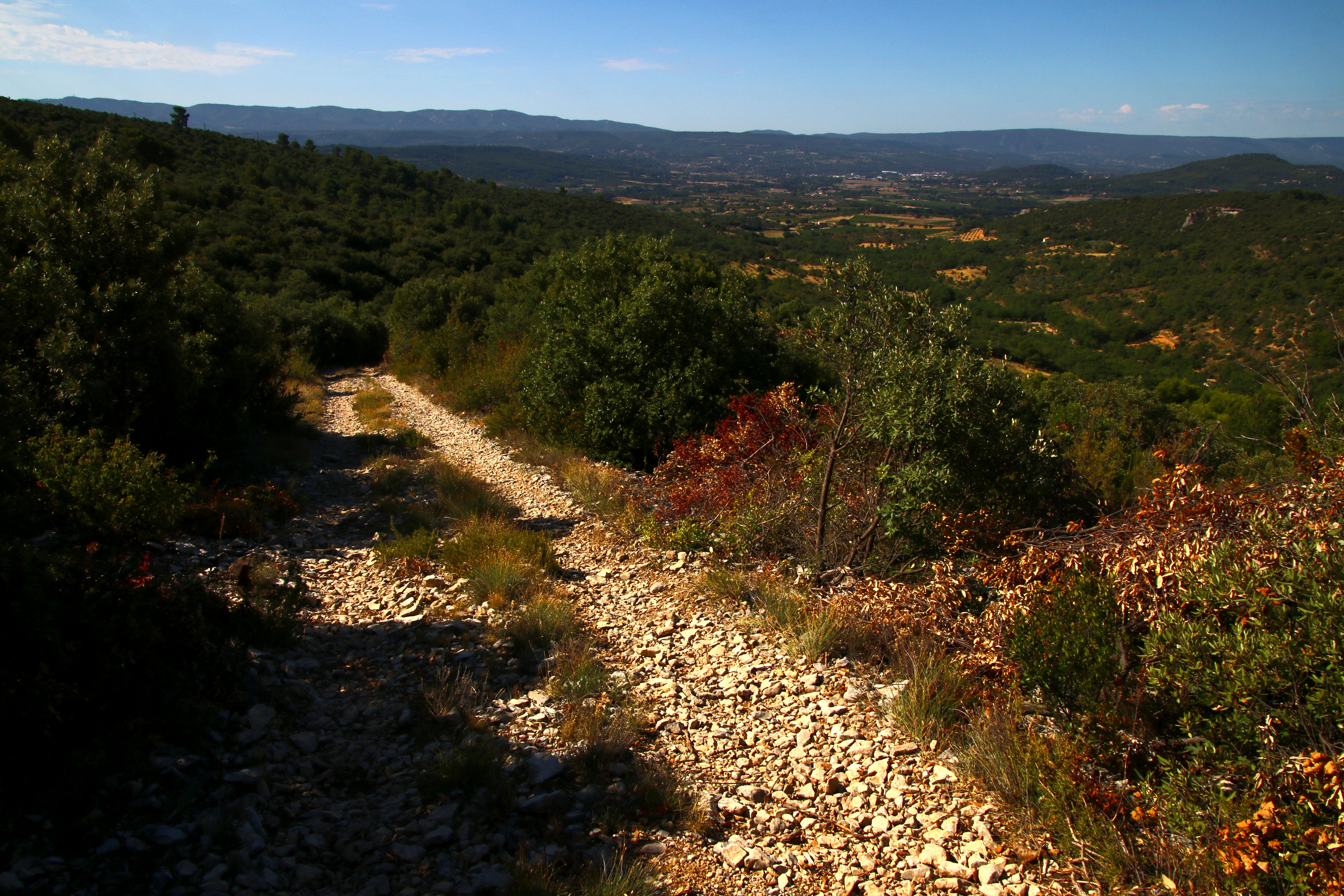
Hiking trail in the commune
