= Villars, Vaucluse =

Villars
- Commune
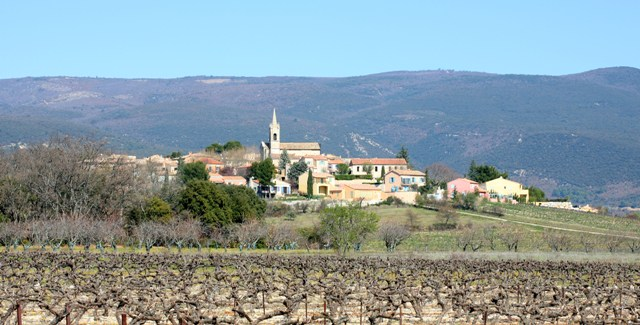
- View of Villars with vineyards

- Coat of arms
- Location of Villars
- Location within France Location within Provence-Alpes-Côte d'Azur
- Coordinates: 43°55′27″N 5°24′22″E
- Country: France
- Region: Provence-Alpes-Côte d'Azur
- Department: Vaucluse
- Arrondissement: Apt
- Canton: Apt

Government
  - Mayor (2020–2026): Sylvie Pereira
- Area^{1}: 30.05 km^{2} (11.60 sq mi)
- Elevation: 300 m (980 ft)
- Highest elevation: 1,184 m (3,885 ft)
- Lowest elevation: 247 m (810 ft)
- Population (2023): 783
  - Density: 26.1/km^{2} (67.5/sq mi)
- Time zone: UTC+01:00 (CET)
  - Summer (DST): UTC+02:00 (CEST)
- INSEE/Postal code: 84145 /84400
- ^{1} French Land Register data, which excludes lakes, ponds, glaciers > 1 km^{2} (0.386 sq mi or 247 acres) and river estuaries.

Villars (French pronunciation: [vilaʁ]; Occitan: Lo Vilar) is a commune in the Vaucluse department in the Provence-Alpes-Côte d'Azur region in southeastern France.

== See also ==
- Communes of the Vaucluse department
- Luberon
