= Beaumettes =

- Commune
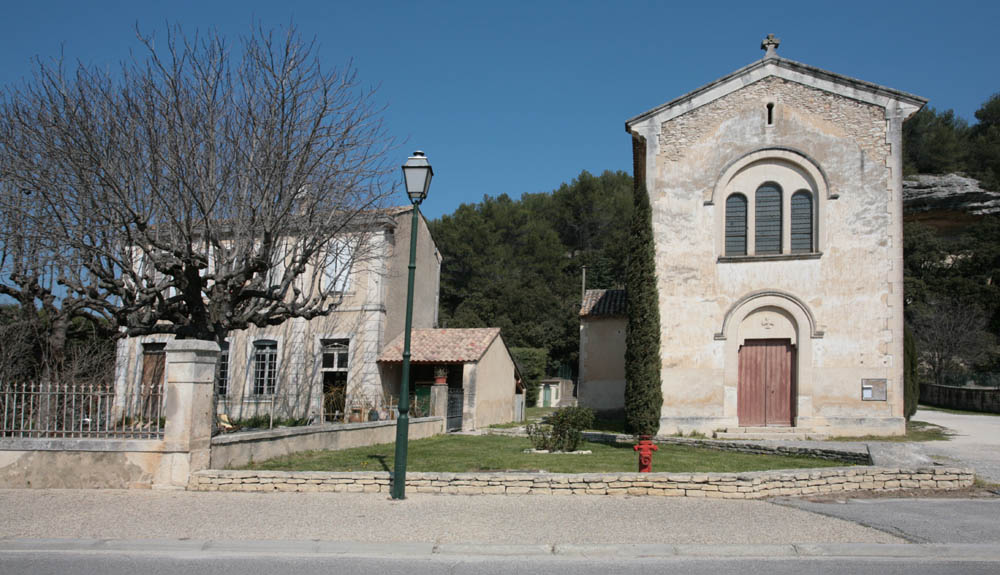
- The village of Beaumettes, with the church to the right

- Coat of arms
- Location of Beaumettes
- Location within France Location within Provence-Alpes-Côte d'Azur
- Coordinates: 43°51′34″N 5°12′10″E
- Country: France
- Region: Provence-Alpes-Côte d'Azur
- Department: Vaucluse
- Arrondissement: Apt
- Canton: Apt
- Intercommunality: CA Luberon Monts de Vaucluse

Government
  - Mayor (2020–2026): Claire Aragones
- Area^{1}: 2.59 km^{2} (1.00 sq mi)
- Elevation: 127 m (417 ft)
- Highest elevation: 229 m (751 ft)
- Lowest elevation: 119 m (390 ft)
- Population (2023): 314
  - Density: 121/km^{2} (314/sq mi)
- Time zone: UTC+01:00 (CET)
  - Summer (DST): UTC+02:00 (CEST)
- INSEE/Postal code: 84013 /84220
- ^{1} French Land Register data, which excludes lakes, ponds, glaciers > 1 km^{2} (0.386 sq mi or 247 acres) and river estuaries.

Beaumettes (French pronunciation: [bomɛt]; Occitan: Lei Baumetas) is a commune in the Vaucluse department in the Provence-Alpes-Côte d'Azur region in southeastern France.

== Geography ==
The village lies on the right bank of the Calavon, which forms all of the commune's southern border.

== See also ==
- Communes of the Vaucluse department
- Luberon
