= Murs, Vaucluse =

Murs
- Commune
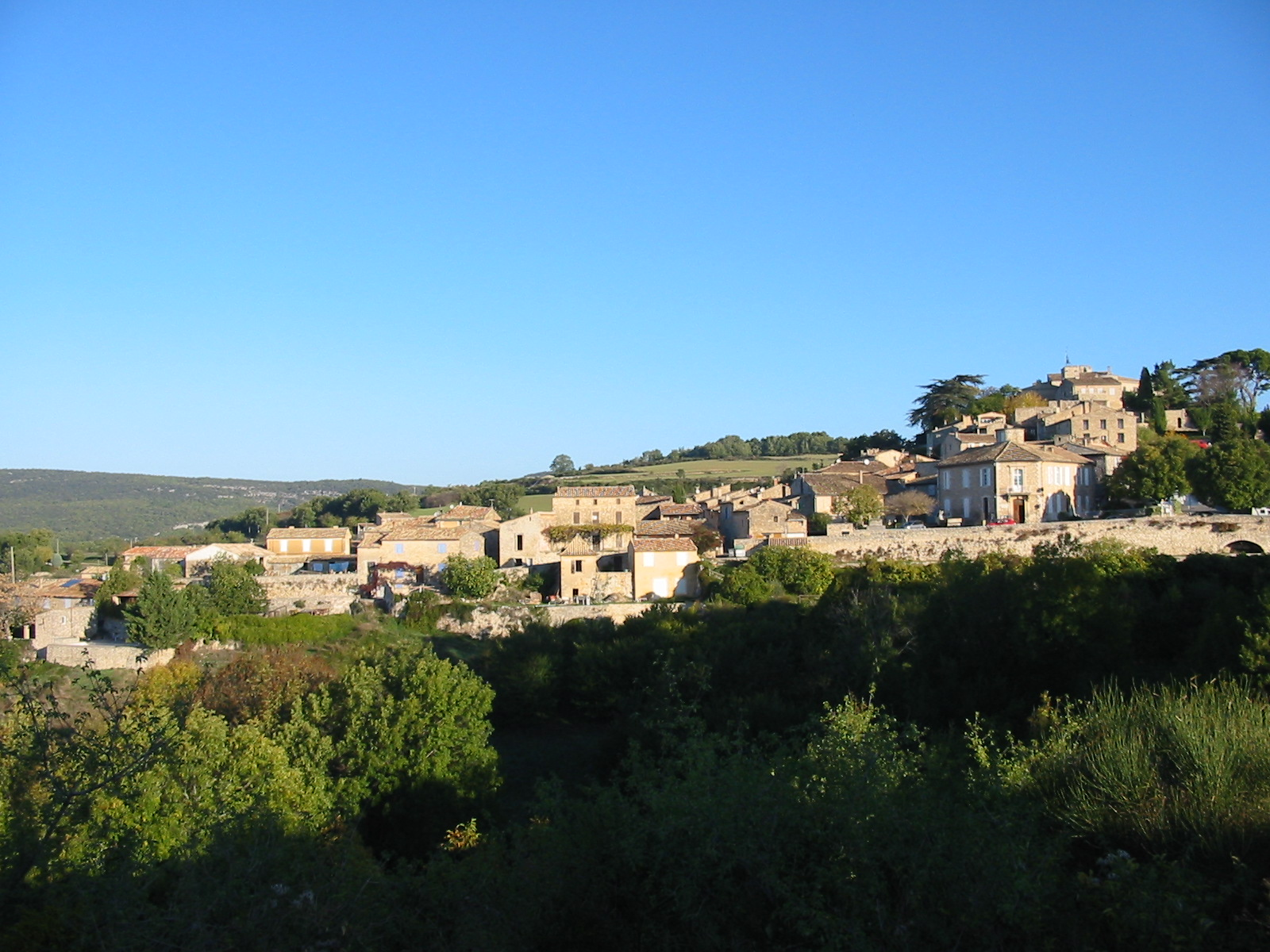
- A general view of the village of Murs

- Coat of arms
- Location of Murs
- Location within France Location within Provence-Alpes-Côte d'Azur
- Coordinates: 43°57′06″N 5°14′30″E
- Country: France
- Region: Provence-Alpes-Côte d'Azur
- Department: Vaucluse
- Arrondissement: Apt
- Canton: Apt

Government
  - Mayor (2020–2026): Xavier Arena
- Area^{1}: 31.26 km^{2} (12.07 sq mi)
- Elevation: 500 m (1,600 ft)
- Highest elevation: 803 m (2,635 ft)
- Lowest elevation: 248 m (814 ft)
- Population (2023): 376
  - Density: 12.0/km^{2} (31.2/sq mi)
- Time zone: UTC+01:00 (CET)
  - Summer (DST): UTC+02:00 (CEST)
- INSEE/Postal code: 84085 /84220
- ^{1} French Land Register data, which excludes lakes, ponds, glaciers > 1 km^{2} (0.386 sq mi or 247 acres) and river estuaries.

Murs (French pronunciation: [myʁs]; Mus in Occitan) is a commune in the Vaucluse department in the Provence-Alpes-Côte d'Azur region in southeastern France.

== See also ==
- Communes of the Vaucluse department
- Luberon
