= Lioux =

- Commune
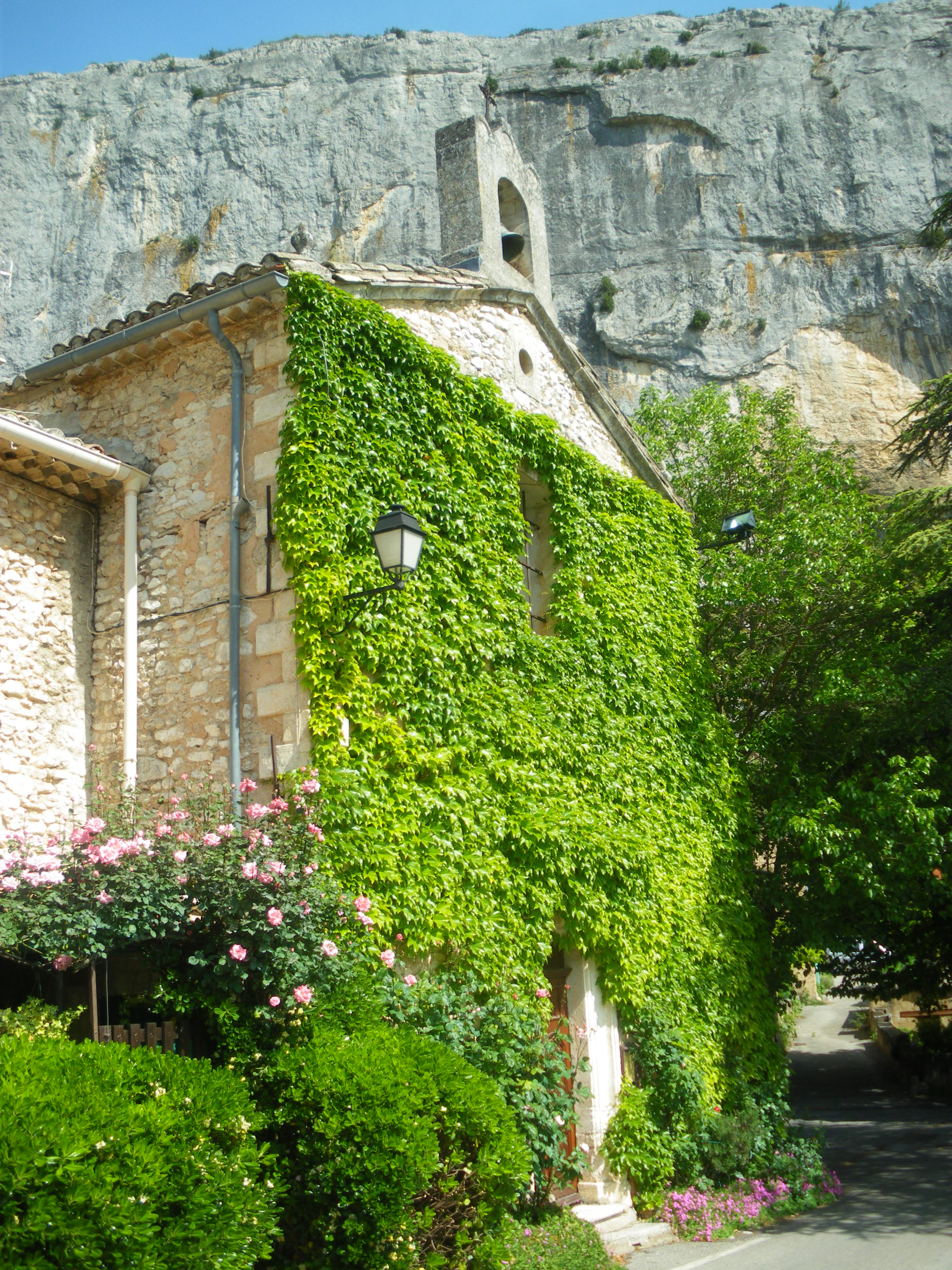
- A general view of Lioux

- Coat of arms
- Location of Lioux
- Location within France Location within Provence-Alpes-Côte d'Azur
- Coordinates: 43°56′51″N 5°18′10″E
- Country: France
- Region: Provence-Alpes-Côte d'Azur
- Department: Vaucluse
- Arrondissement: Apt
- Canton: Apt

Government
  - Mayor (2020–2026): Francis Farge
- Area^{1}: 38.89 km^{2} (15.02 sq mi)
- Elevation: 315 m (1,033 ft)
- Highest elevation: 885 m (2,904 ft)
- Lowest elevation: 237 m (778 ft)
- Population (2023): 286
  - Density: 7.35/km^{2} (19.0/sq mi)
- Time zone: UTC+01:00 (CET)
  - Summer (DST): UTC+02:00 (CEST)
- INSEE/Postal code: 84066 /84220
- ^{1} French Land Register data, which excludes lakes, ponds, glaciers > 1 km^{2} (0.386 sq mi or 247 acres) and river estuaries.

Lioux (Liuç in Occitan) is a commune in the Vaucluse department in the Provence-Alpes-Côte d'Azur region in southeastern France.

== See also ==
- Communes of the Vaucluse department
- Luberon
