= Saint-Pantaléon, Vaucluse =

Saint-Pantaléon
- Commune
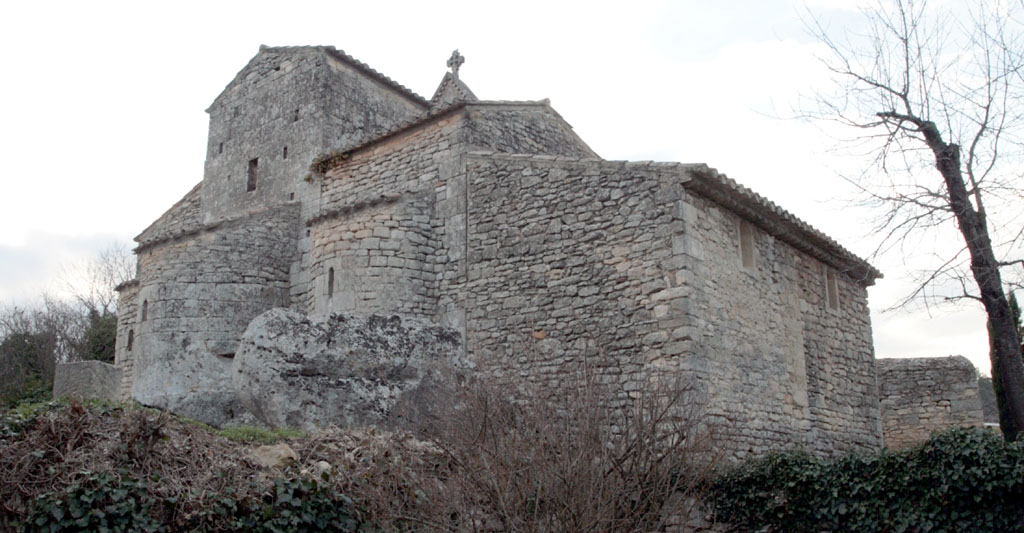
- 12th-century church in Saint-Pantaléon

- Coat of arms
- Location of Saint-Pantaléon
- Location within France Location within Provence-Alpes-Côte d'Azur
- Coordinates: 43°52′54″N 5°13′00″E
- Country: France
- Region: Provence-Alpes-Côte d'Azur
- Department: Vaucluse
- Arrondissement: Apt
- Canton: Apt

Government
  - Mayor (2020–2026): Luc Mille
- Area^{1}: 0.78 km^{2} (0.30 sq mi)
- Population (2023): 222
  - Density: 280/km^{2} (740/sq mi)
- Time zone: UTC+01:00 (CET)
  - Summer (DST): UTC+02:00 (CEST)
- INSEE/Postal code: 84114 /84220
- ^{1} French Land Register data, which excludes lakes, ponds, glaciers > 1 km^{2} (0.386 sq mi or 247 acres) and river estuaries.

Saint-Pantaléon (French pronunciation: [sɛ̃ pɑ̃taleɔ̃]; Occitan: Sant Pantali) is a commune in the Vaucluse department in the Provence-Alpes-Côte d'Azur region in southeastern France.

== See also ==
- Communes of the Vaucluse department
- Luberon
