= Castellet-en-Luberon =

Castellet-en-Luberon Lo Castelet (Occitan)
- Commune
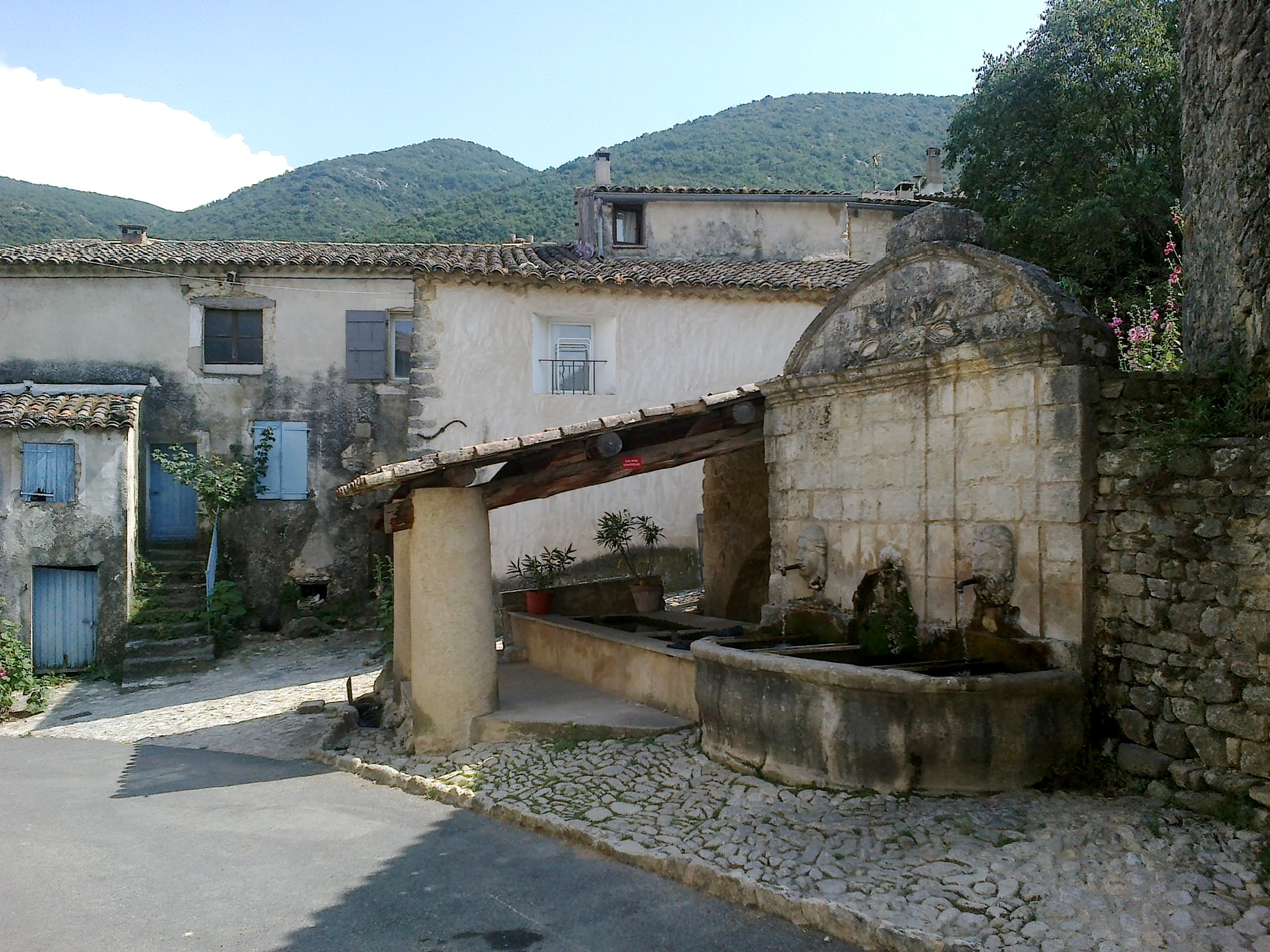
- The historical wash house in the village of Castellet

- Coat of arms
- Location of Castellet-en-Luberon
- Location within France Location within Provence-Alpes-Côte d'Azur
- Coordinates: 43°50′23″N 5°28′41″E
- Country: France
- Region: Provence-Alpes-Côte d'Azur
- Department: Vaucluse
- Arrondissement: Apt
- Canton: Apt
- Intercommunality: CC Pays d'Apt-Luberon

Government
  - Mayor (2020–2026): Roger Isnard
- Area^{1}: 9.84 km^{2} (3.80 sq mi)
- Elevation: 510 m (1,670 ft)
- Highest elevation: 1,120 m (3,670 ft)
- Lowest elevation: 279 m (915 ft)
- Population (2023): 113
  - Density: 11.5/km^{2} (29.7/sq mi)
- Demonym: Castellans
- Time zone: UTC+01:00 (CET)
  - Summer (DST): UTC+02:00 (CEST)
- INSEE/Postal code: 84033 /84400
- ^{1} French Land Register data, which excludes lakes, ponds, glaciers > 1 km^{2} (0.386 sq mi or 247 acres) and river estuaries.

Castellet-en-Luberon (lit. "Castellet-in-Luberon; Occitan: Lo Castelet), known simply as Castellet until 2018, is a commune in the Vaucluse department in the Provence-Alpes-Côte d'Azur region in Southeastern France. As of 2023, the population of the commune was 113.

== Geography ==
The river Calavon forms all of the commune's northern border.

== See also ==
- Côtes du Luberon AOC
- Communes of the Vaucluse department
