= Arrondissement of Apt =

Coordinates: 43.88°N 5.40°E

Apt
- Arrondissement
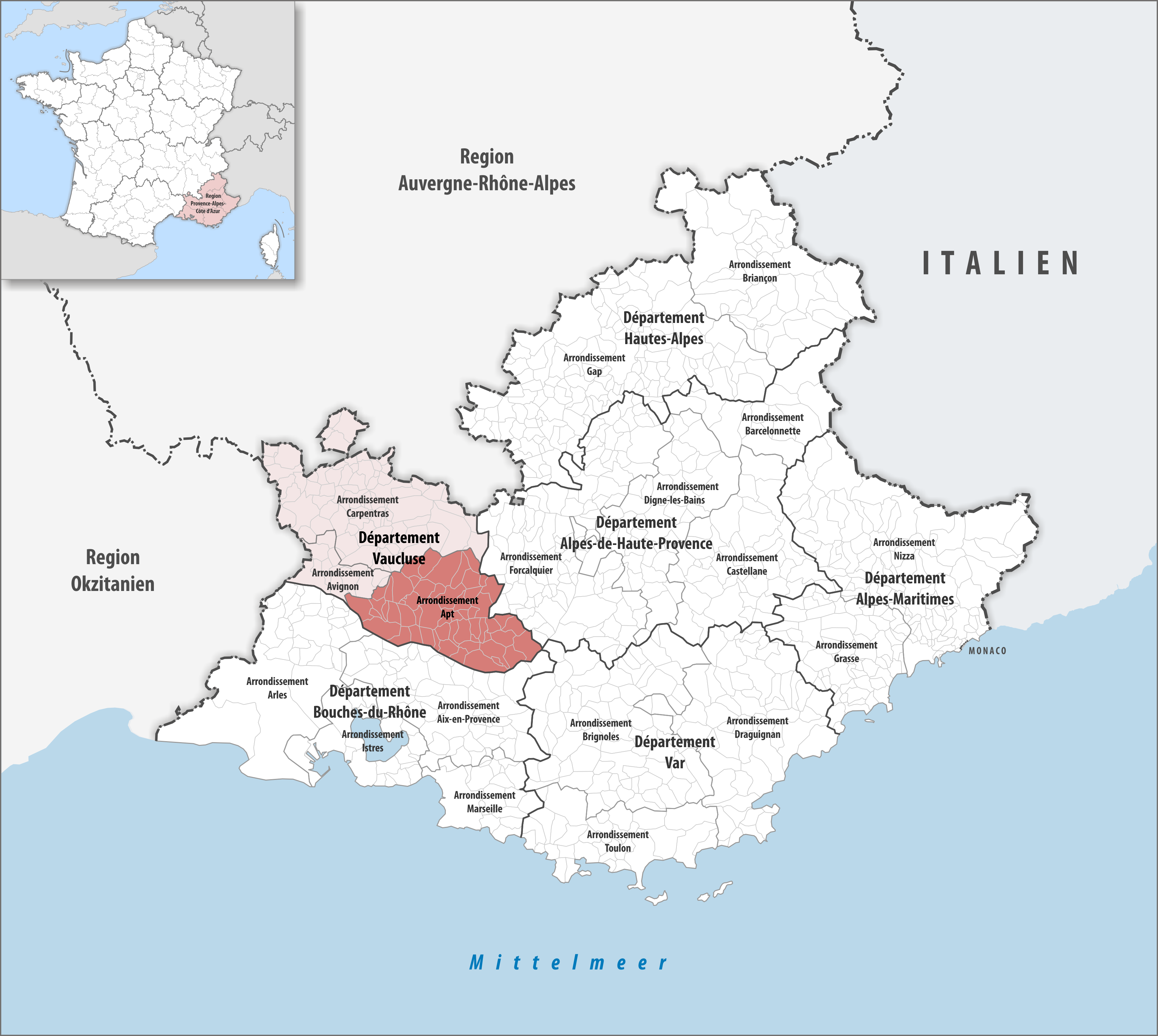
- Location within the region Provence-Alpes-Côte d'Azur
- Country: France
- Region: Provence-Alpes-Côte d'Azur
- Department: Vaucluse
- No. of communes: {{{nbcomm}}}
- Area: 1,390.6 km^{2} (536.9 sq mi)
- Population (2023): 127,585
  - Density: 91.748/km^{2} (237.63/sq mi)
- INSEE code: 841

The arrondissement of Apt is an arrondissement of France in the Vaucluse department in the Provence-Alpes-Côte d'Azur region. It has 57 communes. Its population is 127,891 (2021), and its area is 1,390.6 km^{2} (536.9 sq mi).

== Composition ==
The communes of the arrondissement of Apt are:

1. Ansouis (84002)
2. Apt (84003)
3. Auribeau (84006)
4. La Bastide-des-Jourdans (84009)
5. La Bastidonne (84010)
6. Beaumettes (84013)
7. Beaumont-de-Pertuis (84014)
8. Bonnieux (84020)
9. Buoux (84023)
10. Cabrières-d'Aigues (84024)
11. Cabrières-d'Avignon (84025)
12. Cadenet (84026)
13. Caseneuve (84032)
14. Castellet-en-Luberon (84033)
15. Cavaillon (84035)
16. Cheval-Blanc (84038)
17. Cucuron (84042)
18. Gargas (84047)
19. Gignac (84048)
20. Gordes (84050)
21. Goult (84051)
22. Grambois (84052)
23. Joucas (84057)
24. Lacoste (84058)
25. Lagarde-d'Apt (84060)
26. Lagnes (84062)
27. Lauris (84065)
28. Lioux (84066)
29. Lourmarin (84068)
30. Maubec (84071)
31. Ménerbes (84073)
32. Mérindol (84074)
33. Mirabeau (84076)
34. La Motte-d'Aigues (84084)
35. Murs (84085)
36. Oppède (84086)
37. Pertuis (84089)
38. Peypin-d'Aigues (84090)
39. Puget (84093)
40. Puyvert (84095)
41. Robion (84099)
42. Roussillon (84102)
43. Rustrel (84103)
44. Saignon (84105)
45. Saint-Martin-de-Castillon (84112)
46. Saint-Martin-de-la-Brasque (84113)
47. Saint-Pantaléon (84114)
48. Saint-Saturnin-lès-Apt (84118)
49. Sannes (84121)
50. Sivergues (84128)
51. Taillades (84131)
52. La Tour-d'Aigues (84133)
53. Vaugines (84140)
54. Viens (84144)
55. Villars (84145)
56. Villelaure (84147)
57. Vitrolles-en-Luberon (84151)

== History ==
The arrondissement of Apt was created in 1800. The subprefecture was moved to Cavaillon in 1926, and back to Apt in 1933. At the January 2017 reorganisation of the arrondissements of Vaucluse, it received two communes from the arrondissement of Avignon, and it lost one commune to the arrondissement of Avignon.

As a result of the reorganisation of the cantons of France which came into effect in 2015, the borders of the cantons are no longer related to the borders of the arrondissements. The cantons of the arrondissement of Apt were, as of January 2015:

1. Apt
2. Bonnieux
3. Cadenet
4. Cavaillon
5. Gordes
6. Pertuis
