= Vitrolles =

Vitrolles is the name of several communes in France:

- Vitrolles, Bouches-du-Rhône, in the Bouches-du-Rhône département
- Vitrolles, Hautes-Alpes, in the Hautes-Alpes département
- Vitrolles-en-Lubéron (formerly Vitrolles), in the Vaucluse département
