= La Motte-d'Aigues =

- Commune
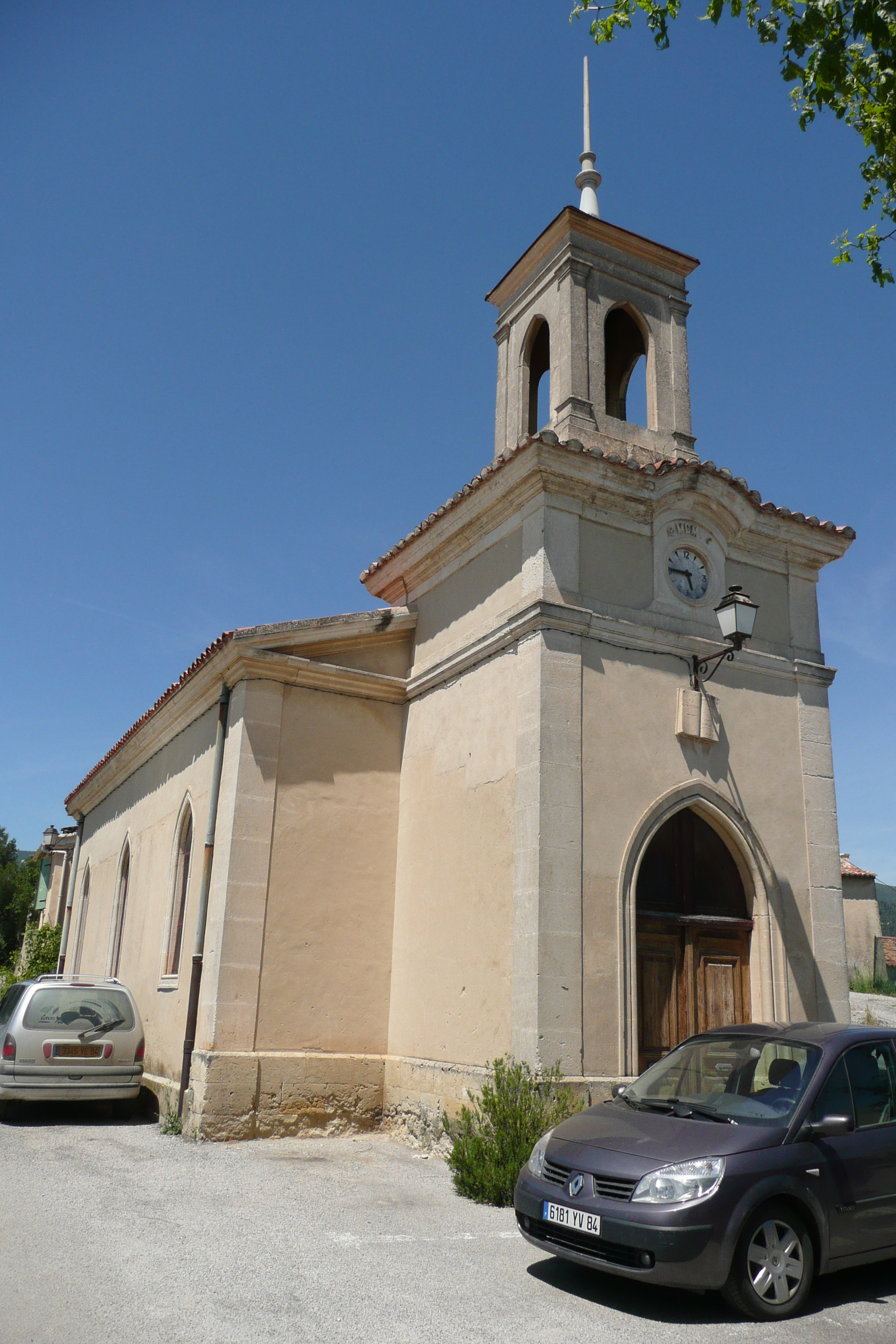
- Church of La Motte-d'Aigues

- Coat of arms
- Location of La Motte-d'Aigues
- Location within France Location within Provence-Alpes-Côte d'Azur
- Coordinates: 43°46′27″N 5°31′18″E
- Country: France
- Region: Provence-Alpes-Côte d'Azur
- Department: Vaucluse
- Arrondissement: Apt
- Canton: Pertuis

Government
  - Mayor (2020–2026): Alain Gouirand
- Area^{1}: 14.63 km^{2} (5.65 sq mi)
- Elevation: 385 m (1,263 ft)
- Highest elevation: 1,060 m (3,480 ft)
- Lowest elevation: 295 m (968 ft)
- Population (2023): 1,438
  - Density: 98.29/km^{2} (254.6/sq mi)
- Time zone: UTC+01:00 (CET)
  - Summer (DST): UTC+02:00 (CEST)
- INSEE/Postal code: 84084 /84240
- ^{1} French Land Register data, which excludes lakes, ponds, glaciers > 1 km^{2} (0.386 sq mi or 247 acres) and river estuaries.

La Motte-d'Aigues (French pronunciation: [la mɔt dɛɡ]; Occitan: La Mota d'Aigas) is a commune in the Vaucluse department in the Provence-Alpes-Côte d'Azur region in southeastern France.

== Geography ==
La Motte-d'Aigues is situated in the southern part of the Parc naturel régional du Luberon between the crest of the Grand Luberon and the hills bordering the Eze river.

== Etymology ==
Motte is a piece of detached land. Aigue describes something that terminates in a point or has been cut away. NOTE: that explanation is incorrect. Motte means a mound; aigues is from the Occitan aigas, meaning waters (derived from Latin aquae), as seen in place names like Aigues-mortes and Aigues-vives in the neighbouring prefecture of Gard. Thus La Motte-d'Aigues means the Mound OF Waters, as evinced by its proximity to the Etang (lake) de la Bonde and the River Eze.

== See also ==
- Côtes du Luberon AOC
- Communes of the Vaucluse department
- Étang de la Bonde
