= Caseneuve =

- Commune
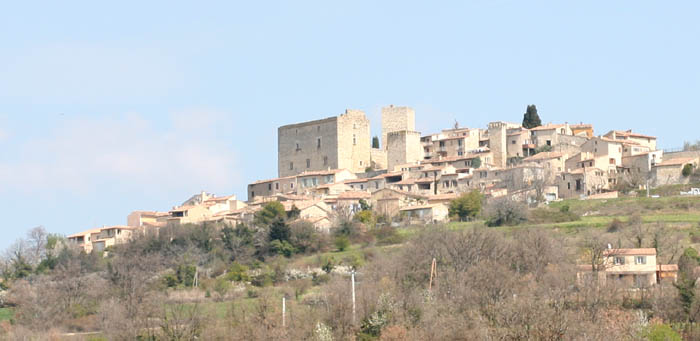
- A view of the village of Caseneuve

- Coat of arms
- Location of Caseneuve
- Location within France Location within Provence-Alpes-Côte d'Azur
- Coordinates: 43°53′16″N 5°29′04″E
- Country: France
- Region: Provence-Alpes-Côte d'Azur
- Department: Vaucluse
- Arrondissement: Apt
- Canton: Apt
- Intercommunality: Pays d'Apt-Luberon

Government
  - Mayor (2020–2026): Gilles Ripert
- Area^{1}: 18.11 km^{2} (6.99 sq mi)
- Elevation: 555 m (1,821 ft)
- Highest elevation: 599 m (1,965 ft)
- Lowest elevation: 244 m (801 ft)
- Population (2023): 527
  - Density: 29.1/km^{2} (75.4/sq mi)
- Time zone: UTC+01:00 (CET)
  - Summer (DST): UTC+02:00 (CEST)
- INSEE/Postal code: 84032 /84750
- ^{1} French Land Register data, which excludes lakes, ponds, glaciers > 1 km^{2} (0.386 sq mi or 247 acres) and river estuaries.

Caseneuve (French pronunciation: [kaznœv]; Occitan: Canòva) is a commune in the Vaucluse department in the Provence-Alpes-Côte d'Azur region in southeastern France.

== Geography ==
The river Calavon forms the commune's south-western border.

== See also ==
- Communes of the Vaucluse department
- Luberon
