= Rustrel =

Rustrel Rustrèu (Occitan)
- Commune
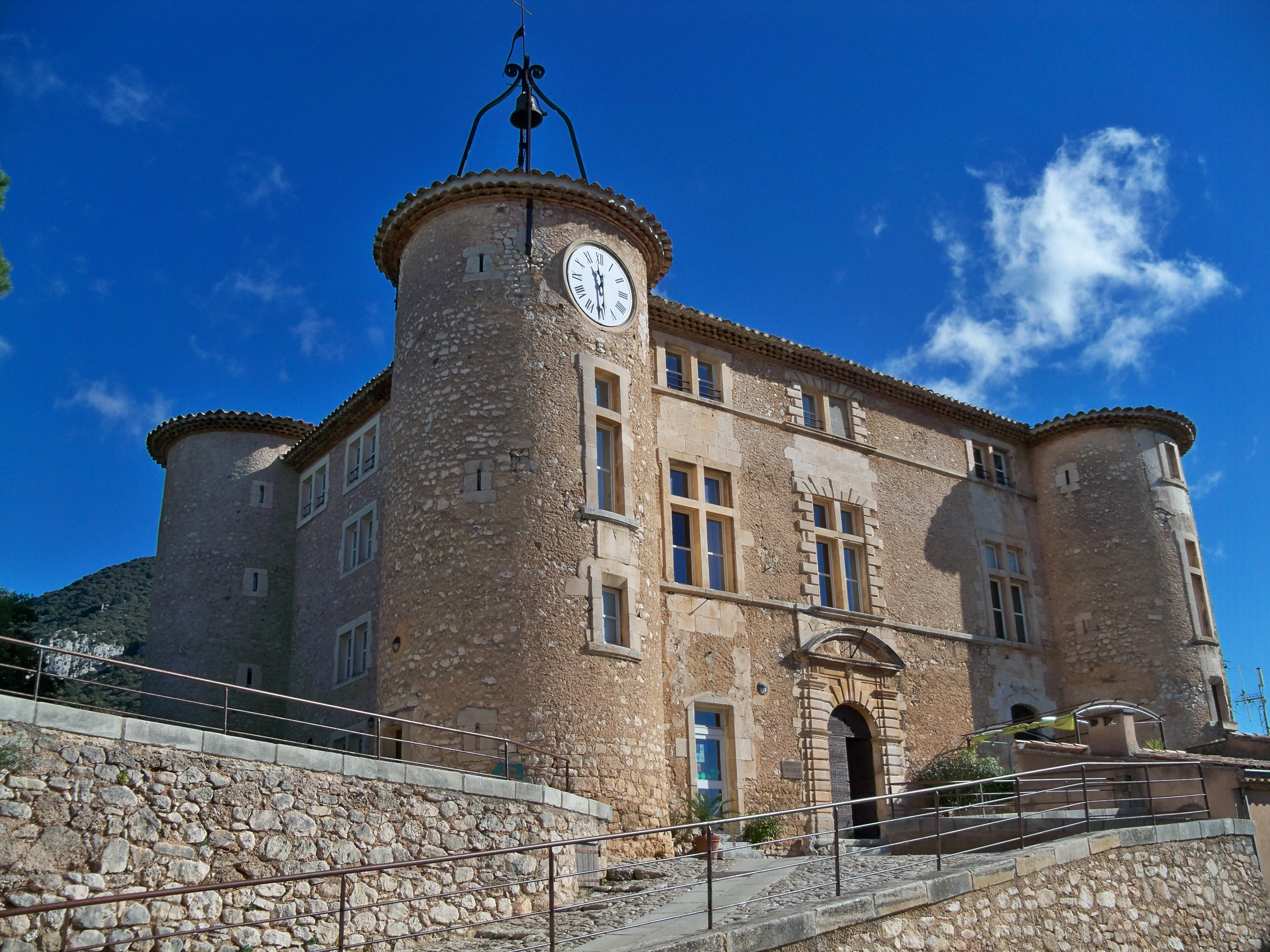
- The Château de Rustrel, a historic monument which houses the town hall

- Coat of arms
- Location of Rustrel
- Location within France Location within Provence-Alpes-Côte d'Azur
- Coordinates: 43°55′31″N 5°29′09″E
- Country: France
- Region: Provence-Alpes-Côte d'Azur
- Department: Vaucluse
- Arrondissement: Apt
- Canton: Apt
- Intercommunality: Pays d'Apt-Luberon

Government
  - Mayor (2020–2026): Pierre Tartanson
- Area^{1}: 28.26 km^{2} (10.91 sq mi)
- Elevation: 422 m (1,385 ft)
- Highest elevation: 1,073 m (3,520 ft)
- Lowest elevation: 279 m (915 ft)
- Population (2023): 672
  - Density: 23.8/km^{2} (61.6/sq mi)
- Time zone: UTC+01:00 (CET)
  - Summer (DST): UTC+02:00 (CEST)
- INSEE/Postal code: 84103 /84400
- ^{1} French Land Register data, which excludes lakes, ponds, glaciers > 1 km^{2} (0.386 sq mi or 247 acres) and river estuaries.

Rustrel (French pronunciation: [ʁystʁɛl]; Occitan: Rustrèu) is a commune in the Vaucluse department in the Provence-Alpes-Côte d'Azur region of Southeastern France. As of 2023, the population of the commune was 672.

== Sights ==
This village is famous for its ochre, which many people come to visit in the French Colorado.

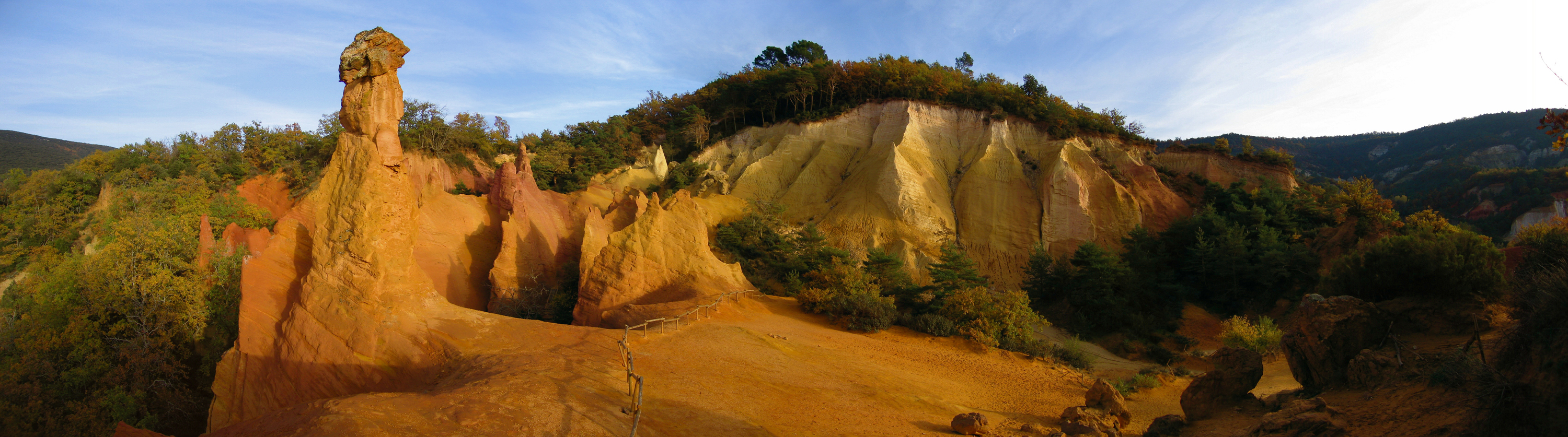
Panoramic of the French Colorado.

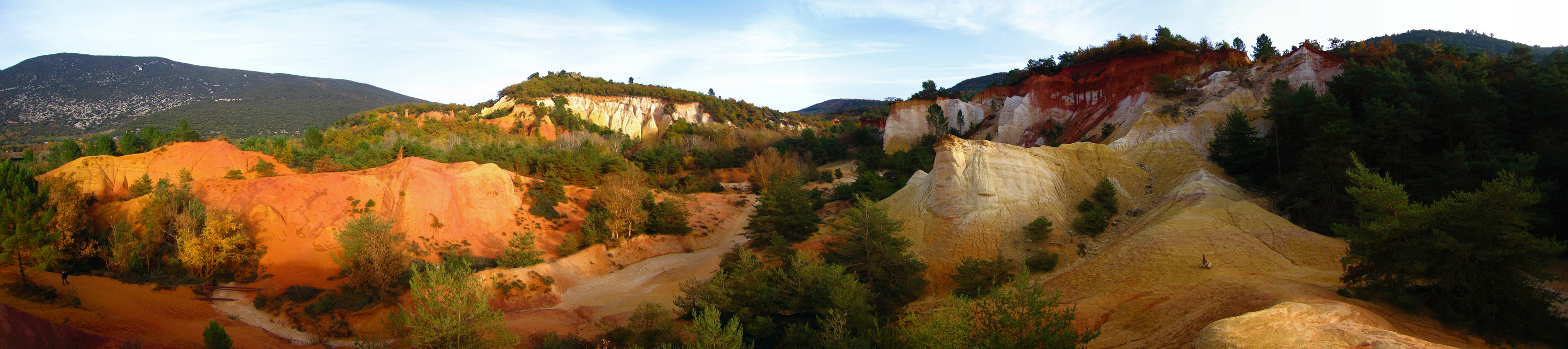
Panoramic of the French Colorado.

== See also ==
- Communes of the Vaucluse department
- Luberon
