= Lagarde-d'Apt =

- Commune
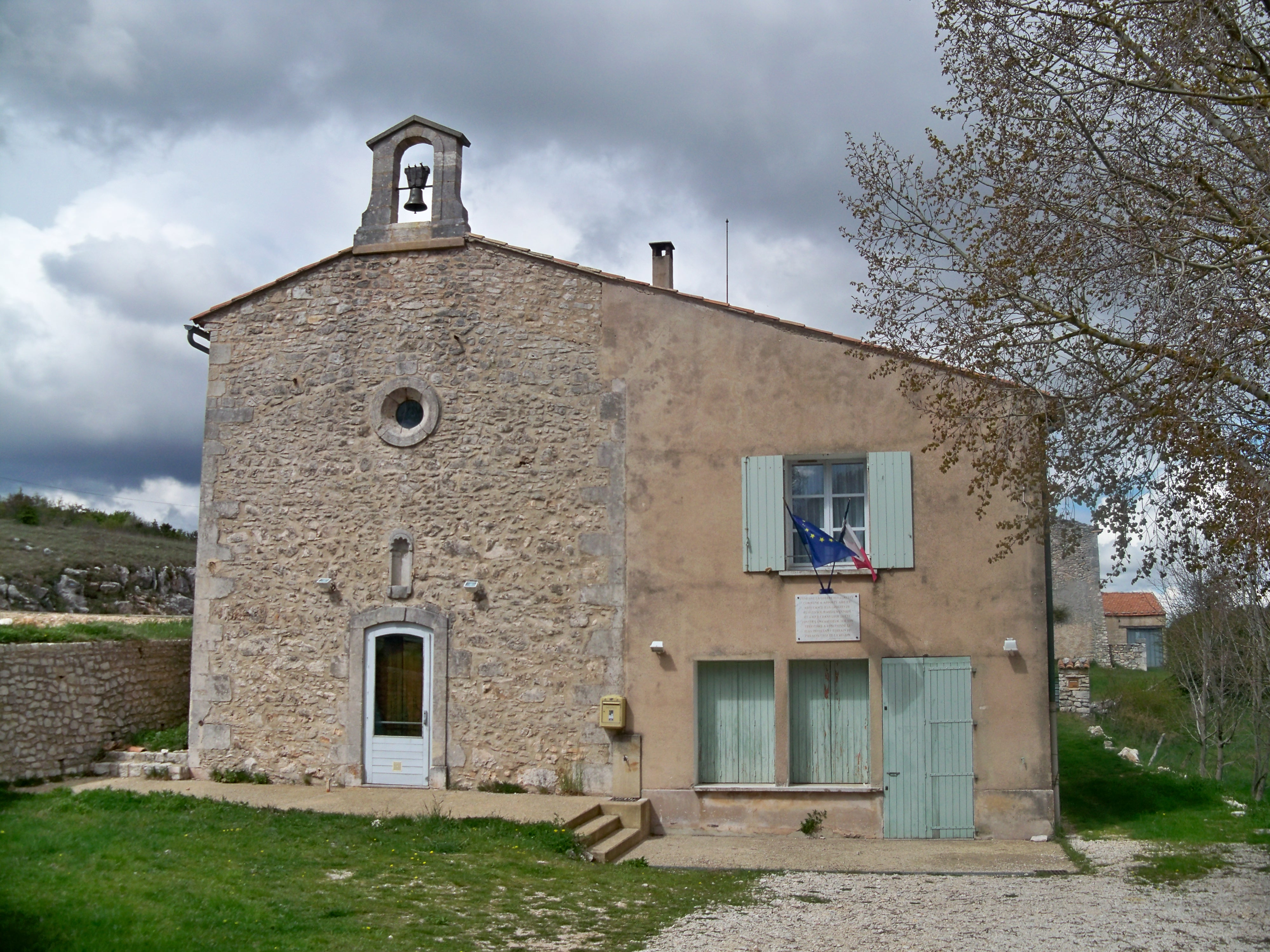
- The town hall and church of Lagarde-d'Apt

- Coat of arms
- Location of Lagarde-d'Apt
- Location within France Location within Provence-Alpes-Côte d'Azur
- Coordinates: 43°59′04″N 5°28′26″E
- Country: France
- Region: Provence-Alpes-Côte d'Azur
- Department: Vaucluse
- Arrondissement: Apt
- Canton: Apt

Government
  - Mayor (2021–2026): Maryse Bonnet
- Area^{1}: 21.79 km^{2} (8.41 sq mi)
- Elevation: 1,087 m (3,566 ft)
- Highest elevation: 1,252 m (4,108 ft)
- Lowest elevation: 829 m (2,720 ft)
- Population (2023): 30
  - Density: 1.4/km^{2} (3.6/sq mi)
- Time zone: UTC+01:00 (CET)
  - Summer (DST): UTC+02:00 (CEST)
- INSEE/Postal code: 84060 /84400
- ^{1} French Land Register data, which excludes lakes, ponds, glaciers > 1 km^{2} (0.386 sq mi or 247 acres) and river estuaries.

Lagarde-d'Apt (French pronunciation: [laɡaʁd dapt], literally Lagarde of Apt; Occitan: La Gàrda d'Ate) is a commune in the Vaucluse department in the Provence-Alpes-Côte d'Azur region in southeastern France.

It is a local centre for lavender distilling for the perfume trade, containing two lavender distilleries. The town is also the home of the famous Chevredou cheese shop.

At 1100 m above sea level, the village is the highest point in the Apt region, and with its setting in hills and lavender fields, is a local centre for the hiking industry.

== See also ==
- Luberon
- Communes of the Vaucluse department
