= Luberon AOC =

- Wine region
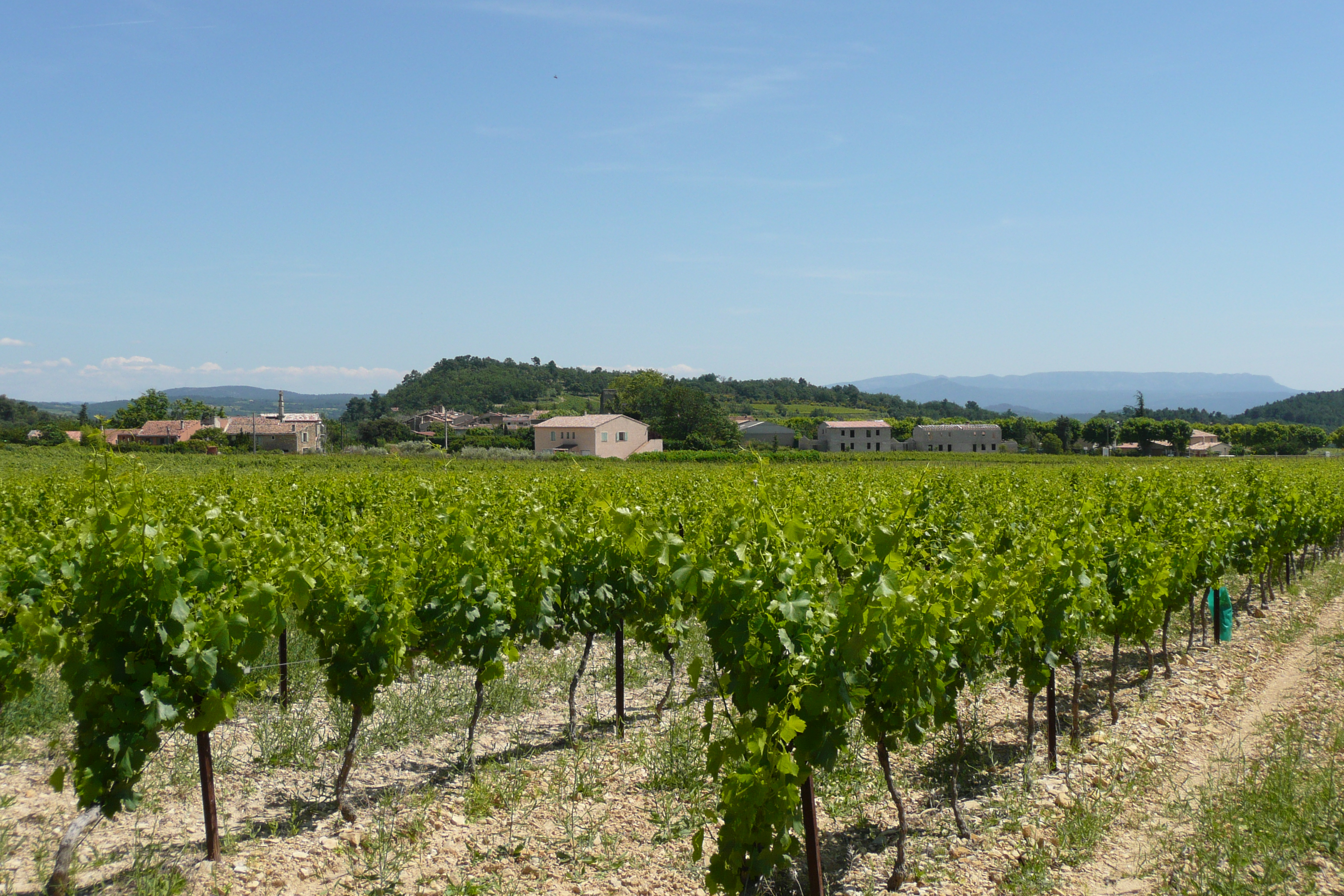
- Type: AOC
- Year established: 1988
- Years of wine industry: 2,000
- Country: France
- Part of: Rhône Valley
- Climate region: mediterranean
- Soil conditions: calcerous marl, Miocene sands and molasse
- Size of planted vineyards: 2,712
- No. of vineyards: 450
- Grapes produced: Grenache noir, Syrah, Cinsault, Mourvèdre, Carignan, Counoise noir, Gamay noir, Pinot noir, Clairette blanche, Grenache blanc, Ugni blanc, Roussanne, Marsanne
- Wine produced: red, white, rosé
- Comments: Data from 2005

Luberon (French pronunciation: [lyb(ə)ʁɔ̃] or [lybeʁɔ̃]; known as Côtes du Luberon until 2009) is a French wine-growing AOC in the southeastern extreme of the Rhône wine region of France in Provence. It includes vineyards in 36 communes of the Vaucluse département. The neighbouring appellation of Ventoux AOC stretches along its northern border, separated by the Calavon river. The southern limit of the region is marked by the Durance river, south of which is Coteaux d'Aix-en-Provence AOC. To the north-east is the Coteaux de Pierrevert AOC.

== Economy ==
The Luberon wines are produced by a total of 495 concerns which include 480 growers, 55 private wineries, 14 cooperative wineries, and one producer/merchant. The vineyards are in the communes of Ansouis, Apt, La Bastide-des-Jourdans, La Bastidonne, Beaumont-de-Pertuis, Bonnieux, Cabrières-d'Aigues, Cadenet, Castellet, Cheval-Blanc, Cucuron, Goult, Grambois, Lacoste, Lauris, Lourmarin, Maubec, Ménerbes, Mérindol, Mirabeau, La Motte-d'Aigues, Puget, Puyvert, Robion, Saignon, Saint-Martin-de-Castillon, Saint-Martin-de-la-Brasque, Sannes, Taillades, La Tour-d'Aigues, Vaugines, Villelaure, Vitrolles-en-Luberon.

The office of the syndicat (the body that represents all the growers and winemakers of the appellation) is in Lourmarin.

55% of all Luberon wine is produced by Marrenon, a union of the cooperatives of the area.

== Wines ==
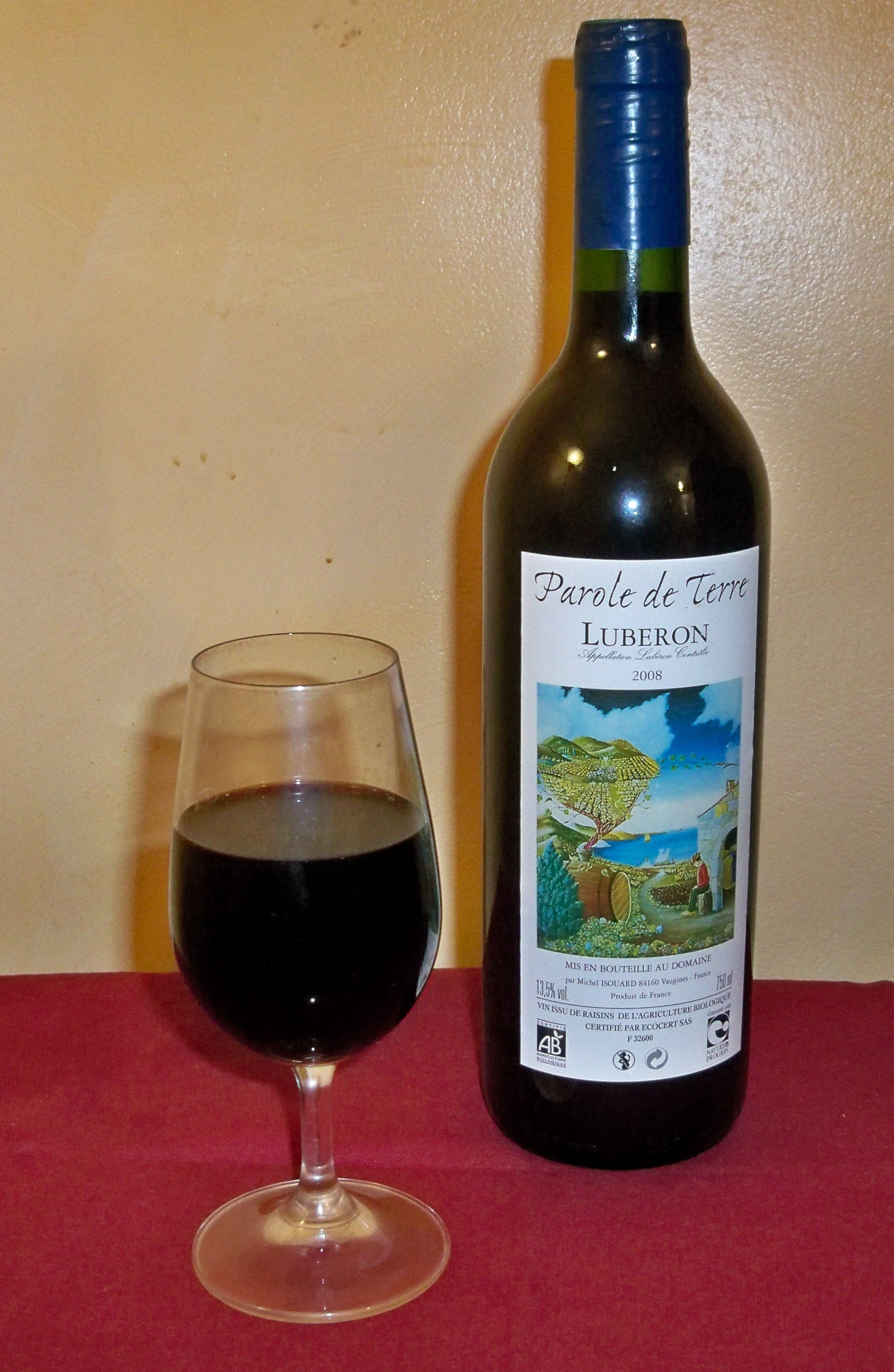
A red wine from the Côtes du Luberon.

Red wines are made from Grenache noir and Syrah (minimum 60%, of which Syrah minimum 10%), Cinsault (maximum 20%), and Carignan (maximum 20%). Other accepted varieties are: Counoise, Gamay noir, Mourvèdre, Pinot noir.

Rosé: The same varieties are used as for the red, and up to 20% of the allowed varieties for white wine may be used.

White wines from Ugni blanc (maximum 50%), Roussanne & Marsanne (combined maximum of 20%), Clairette blanche, Grenache blanc, Vermentino, and Bourboulenc.

The minimum alcohol content for all three colors is 11%.

== History ==
The wines received AOC status in 1988, under the name Côtes du Luberon. The name change to Luberon took place on 23 September 2009.
