= Taillades =

- Commune
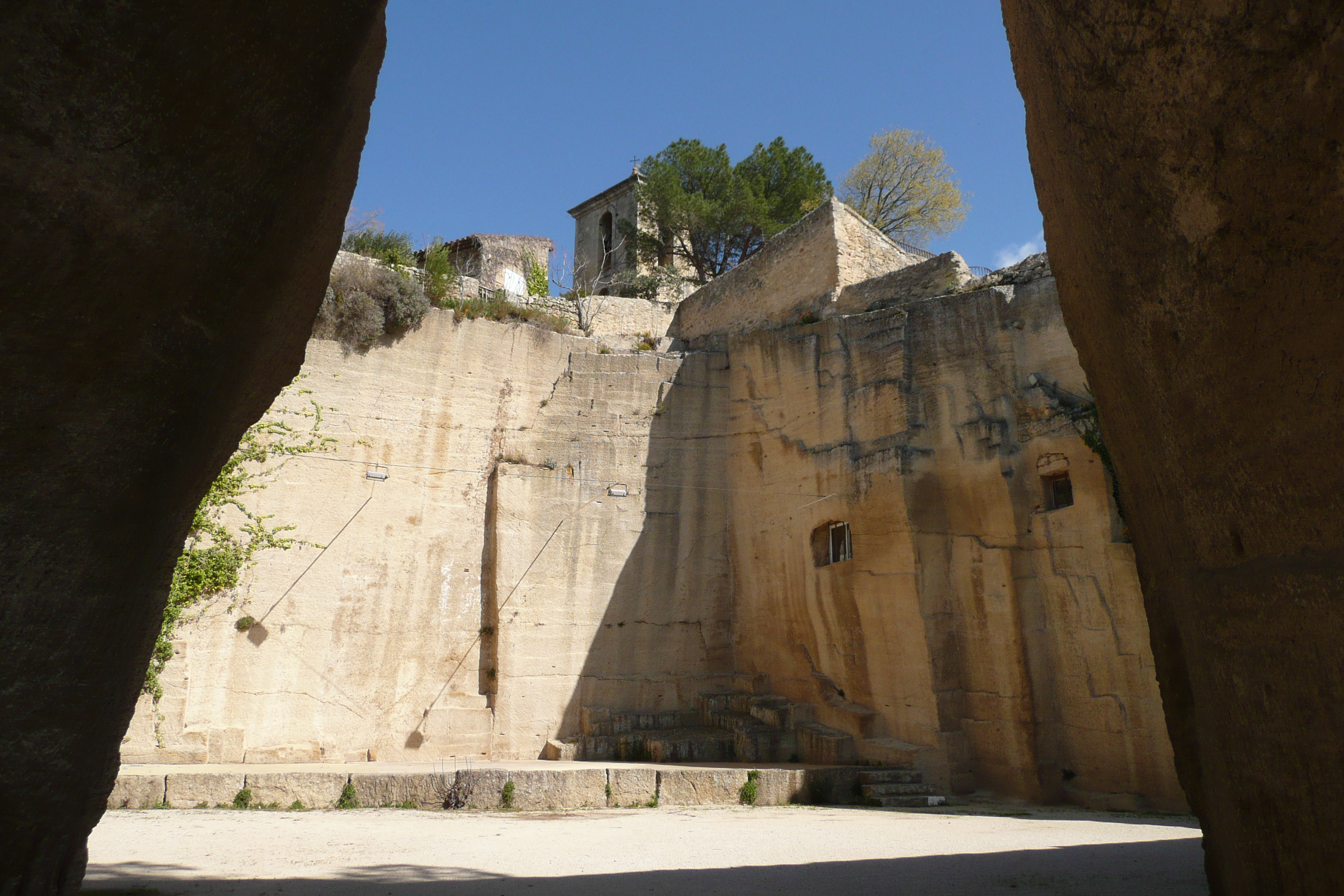
- The old quarry, which is now an open-air theatre

- Coat of arms
- Location of Taillades
- Location within France Location within Provence-Alpes-Côte d'Azur
- Coordinates: 43°50′13″N 5°05′29″E
- Country: France
- Region: Provence-Alpes-Côte d'Azur
- Department: Vaucluse
- Arrondissement: Apt
- Canton: Cheval-Blanc
- Intercommunality: CA Luberon Monts de Vaucluse

Government
  - Mayor (2020–2026): Nicole Girard
- Area^{1}: 6.86 km^{2} (2.65 sq mi)
- Population (2023): 2,040
  - Density: 297/km^{2} (770/sq mi)
- Time zone: UTC+01:00 (CET)
  - Summer (DST): UTC+02:00 (CEST)
- INSEE/Postal code: 84131 /84300
- ^{1} French Land Register data, which excludes lakes, ponds, glaciers > 1 km^{2} (0.386 sq mi or 247 acres) and river estuaries.

Taillades (French pronunciation: [tajad]; Occitan: Lei Talhadas) is a commune in the Vaucluse department in the Provence-Alpes-Côte d'Azur region in southeastern France.

It is 6 km (3.7 mi) east of Cavaillon, and 25 km (16 mi) south east of Avignon. Situated in the Luberon, the village covers 675 hectares of which 320 are forest.

The village was awarded the 'two flowers' standard in the national competition for floral villages.

== History ==
The village developed as a community of stone workers employed at the quarries nearby. The entrance to the old village is marked by a medieval tower, a vestige of the original castle. The castle was rebuilt in the seventeenth century. In 1859, the village mill, Moulin Saint-Pierre, was built. Today it is used as a party hall and meeting room for the village.

== Population ==
Historical population
Year	Pop.	±% p.a.
1968	695	—
1975	1,211	+8.26%
1982	1,501	+3.11%
1990	1,642	+1.13%
1999	1,792	+0.98%
2007	1,902	+0.75%
2012	1,968	+0.68%
2017	1,909	−0.61%
2023	2,040	+1.11%
Source: INSEE

== See also ==
- Côtes du Luberon AOC
- Communes of the Vaucluse department
- Luberon
