= Maubec, Vaucluse =

Maubec
- Commune
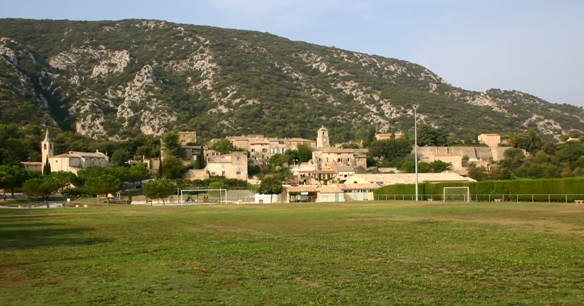
- Town hall

- Coat of arms
- Location of Maubec
- Location within France Location within Provence-Alpes-Côte d'Azur
- Coordinates: 43°50′41″N 5°08′24″E
- Country: France
- Region: Provence-Alpes-Côte d'Azur
- Department: Vaucluse
- Arrondissement: Apt
- Canton: Cheval-Blanc
- Intercommunality: CA Luberon Monts de Vaucluse

Government
  - Mayor (2020–2026): Frédéric Massip
- Area^{1}: 9.13 km^{2} (3.53 sq mi)
- Elevation: 105 m (344 ft)
- Highest elevation: 663 m (2,175 ft)
- Lowest elevation: 97 m (318 ft)
- Population (2023): 1,915
  - Density: 210/km^{2} (543/sq mi)
- Time zone: UTC+01:00 (CET)
  - Summer (DST): UTC+02:00 (CEST)
- INSEE/Postal code: 84071 /84660
- ^{1} French Land Register data, which excludes lakes, ponds, glaciers > 1 km^{2} (0.386 sq mi or 247 acres) and river estuaries.

Maubec (French pronunciation: [mobɛk]; Occitan: Maubèc) is a commune in the Vaucluse department in the Provence-Alpes-Côte d'Azur region in southeastern France.

== Geography ==
The river Calavon flows westward through the northern part of the commune.

== See also ==
- Côtes du Luberon AOC
- Communes of the Vaucluse department
- Luberon
