= Saint-Martin-de-la-Brasque =

- Commune
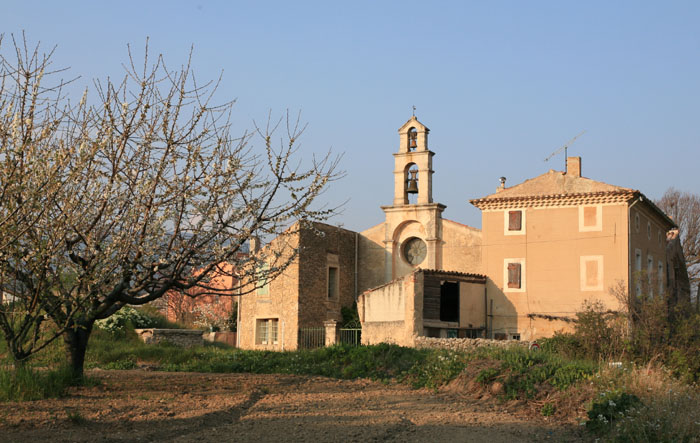
- The bell tower in Saint-Martin-de-la-Brasque

- Coat of arms
- Location of Saint-Martin-de-la-Brasque
- Location within France Location within Provence-Alpes-Côte d'Azur
- Coordinates: 43°46′15″N 5°32′16″E
- Country: France
- Region: Provence-Alpes-Côte d'Azur
- Department: Vaucluse
- Arrondissement: Apt
- Canton: Pertuis

Government
  - Mayor (2020–2026): Joëlle Richaud
- Area^{1}: 5.64 km^{2} (2.18 sq mi)
- Elevation: 380 m (1,250 ft)
- Highest elevation: 421 m (1,381 ft)
- Lowest elevation: 293 m (961 ft)
- Population (2023): 805
  - Density: 143/km^{2} (370/sq mi)
- Time zone: UTC+01:00 (CET)
  - Summer (DST): UTC+02:00 (CEST)
- INSEE/Postal code: 84113 /84760
- ^{1} French Land Register data, which excludes lakes, ponds, glaciers > 1 km^{2} (0.386 sq mi or 247 acres) and river estuaries.

Saint-Martin-de-la-Brasque (French pronunciation: [sɛ̃ maʁtɛ̃ də la bʁask]; Occitan: Sant Martin de la Brasca) is a commune in the Vaucluse department in the Provence-Alpes-Côte d'Azur region in southeastern France.

== See also ==
- Côtes du Luberon AOC
- Communes of the Vaucluse department
- Luberon
