= Villelaure =

- Commune
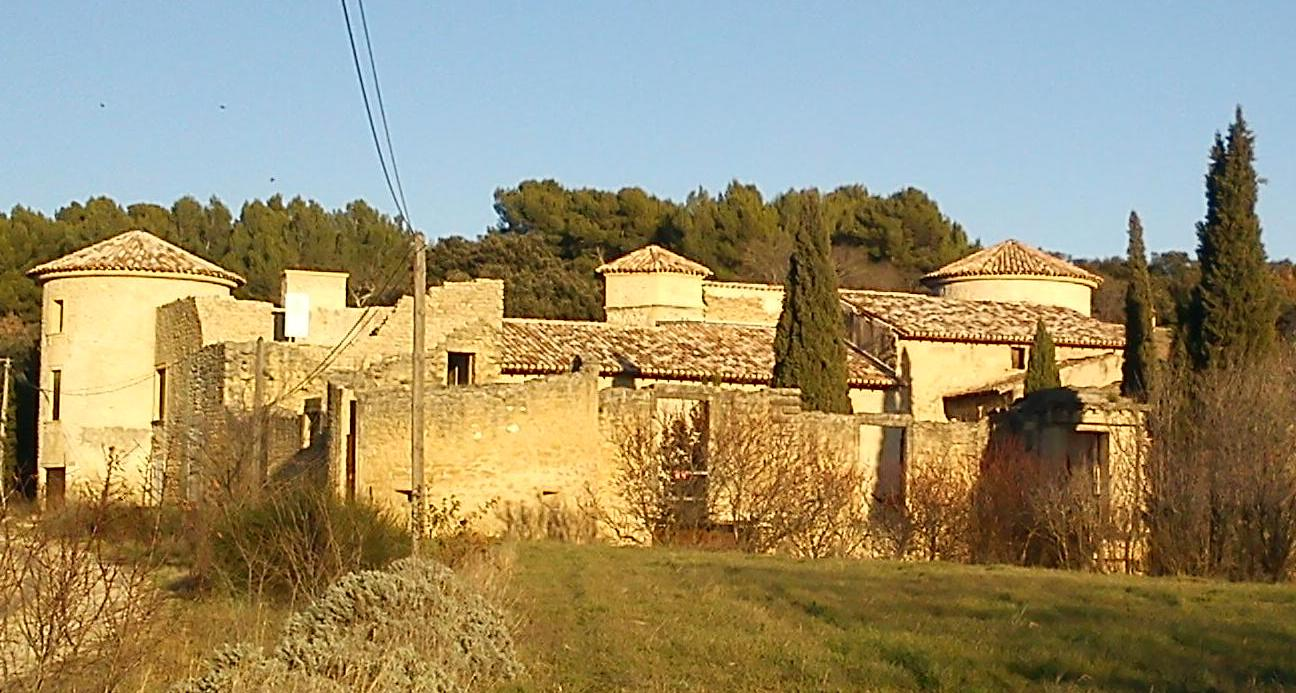
- Castle Forbin

- Coat of arms
- Location of Villelaure
- Location within France Location within Provence-Alpes-Côte d'Azur
- Coordinates: 43°42′41″N 5°26′05″E
- Country: France
- Region: Provence-Alpes-Côte d'Azur
- Department: Vaucluse
- Arrondissement: Apt
- Canton: Pertuis

Government
  - Mayor (2020–2026): Jean-Louis Robert
- Area^{1}: 18.25 km^{2} (7.05 sq mi)
- Elevation: 173 m (568 ft)
- Highest elevation: 369 m (1,211 ft)
- Lowest elevation: 159 m (522 ft)
- Population (2023): 3,398
  - Density: 186.2/km^{2} (482.2/sq mi)
- Time zone: UTC+01:00 (CET)
  - Summer (DST): UTC+02:00 (CEST)
- INSEE/Postal code: 84147 /84530
- ^{1} French Land Register data, which excludes lakes, ponds, glaciers > 1 km^{2} (0.386 sq mi or 247 acres) and river estuaries.

Villelaure (French pronunciation: [vil(ə)loʁ]; Occitan: Vilalaura) is a commune in the Vaucluse department in the Provence-Alpes-Côte d'Azur region in southeastern France.

== History ==
The village takes its name from the Roman-era settlement of Villa Laura which was at the same location or nearby. Since Roman times, a nucleus of inhabitants lived near the present village. However, like all the southern Luberon, Villelaure and its region were completely ruined in the second half of the 14th century by the ravages of the Hundred Years War and the Black Death.

Villelaure is one of about forty localities, on both sides of the Luberon, in which at least 1,400 families from the alpine valleys of Piedmont and approximately 6,000 people came from the alpine dioceses of Turin and Embrun between 1460 and 1560.

In 1512, Antoinette de la Terre, assisted by her husband Jean de Forbin, established Villelaure with 19 families from the neighboring villages and Piedmont.

== Population ==
Historical population
Year	Pop.	±% p.a.
1968	1,284	—
1975	1,275	−0.10%
1982	1,471	+2.06%
1990	2,135	+4.77%
1999	2,914	+3.52%
2007	3,093	+0.75%
2012	3,246	+0.97%
2017	3,477	+1.38%
2023	3,398	−0.38%
Source: INSEE

== See also ==
- Côtes du Luberon AOC
- Communes of the Vaucluse department
- Luberon
