= Gargas, Vaucluse =

Gargas
- Commune
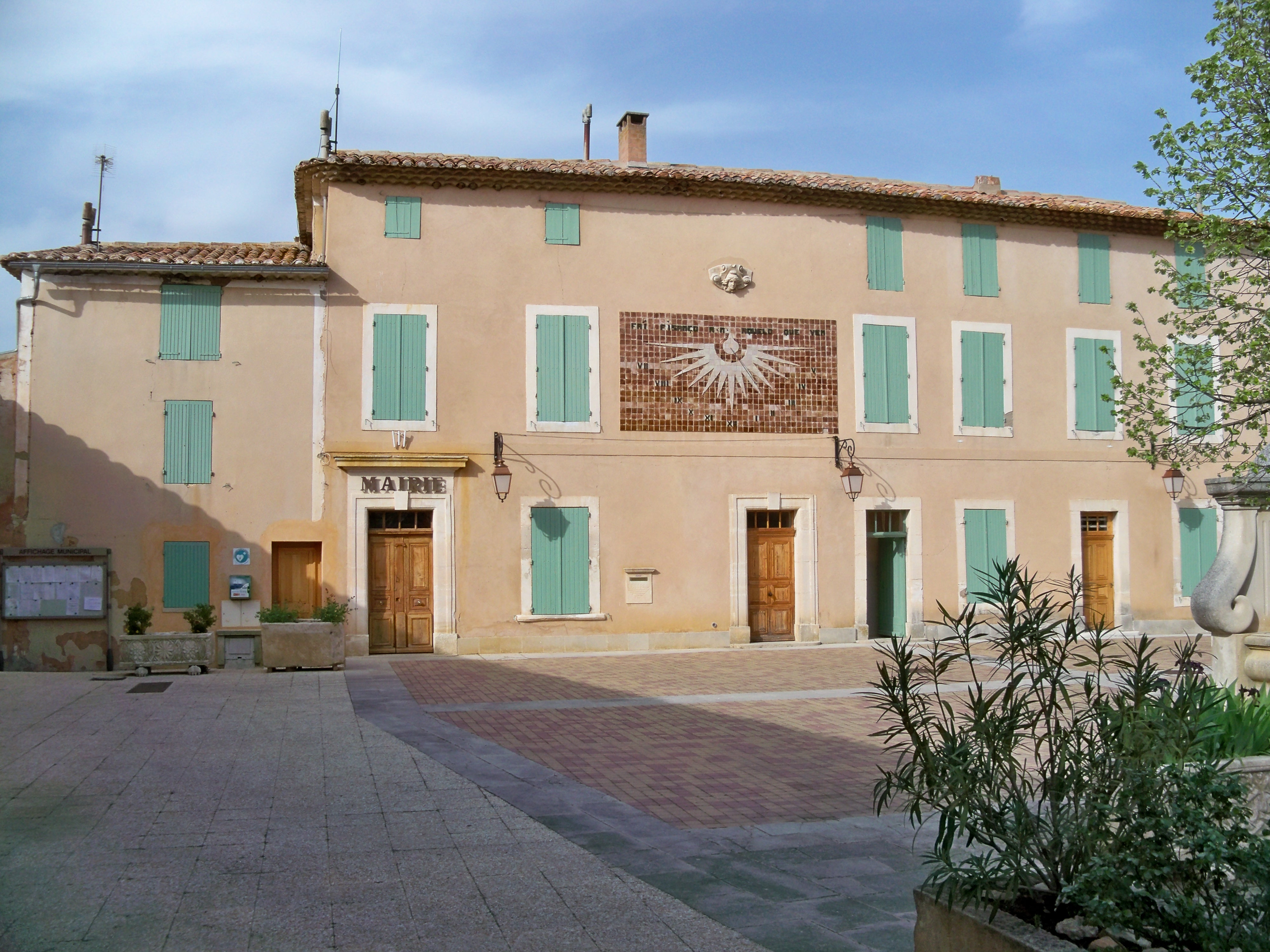
- The town hall of Gargas

- Coat of arms
- Location of Gargas
- Location within France Location within Provence-Alpes-Côte d'Azur
- Coordinates: 43°54′09″N 5°21′34″E
- Country: France
- Region: Provence-Alpes-Côte d'Azur
- Department: Vaucluse
- Arrondissement: Apt
- Canton: Apt

Government
  - Mayor (2023–2026): Bruno Vigne-Ulmier
- Area^{1}: 14.9 km^{2} (5.8 sq mi)
- Elevation: 420 m (1,380 ft)
- Highest elevation: 461 m (1,512 ft)
- Lowest elevation: 201 m (659 ft)
- Population (2023): 3,035
  - Density: 204/km^{2} (528/sq mi)
- Time zone: UTC+01:00 (CET)
  - Summer (DST): UTC+02:00 (CEST)
- INSEE/Postal code: 84047 /84400
- ^{1} French Land Register data, which excludes lakes, ponds, glaciers > 1 km^{2} (0.386 sq mi or 247 acres) and river estuaries.

Gargas (French pronunciation: [ɡaʁɡas]; Occitan: Gargaç) is a commune in the Vaucluse department in the Provence-Alpes-Côte d'Azur region in southeastern France. The writer Raymond Jean (1925–2012) died in Gargas.

Gargas is the site of old ochre mining operations. In 2009 the Mine d'Ocre de Bruoux was opened for tourists.

== Population ==
Historical population
Year	Pop.	±% p.a.
1968	690	—
1975	1,065	+6.40%
1982	1,870	+8.37%
1990	2,875	+5.52%
1999	2,928	+0.20%
2007	2,995	+0.28%
2012	2,843	−1.04%
2017	3,039	+1.34%
2023	3,035	−0.02%
Source: INSEE

== See also ==
- Communes of the Vaucluse department
- Luberon
