= Grambois =

- Commune
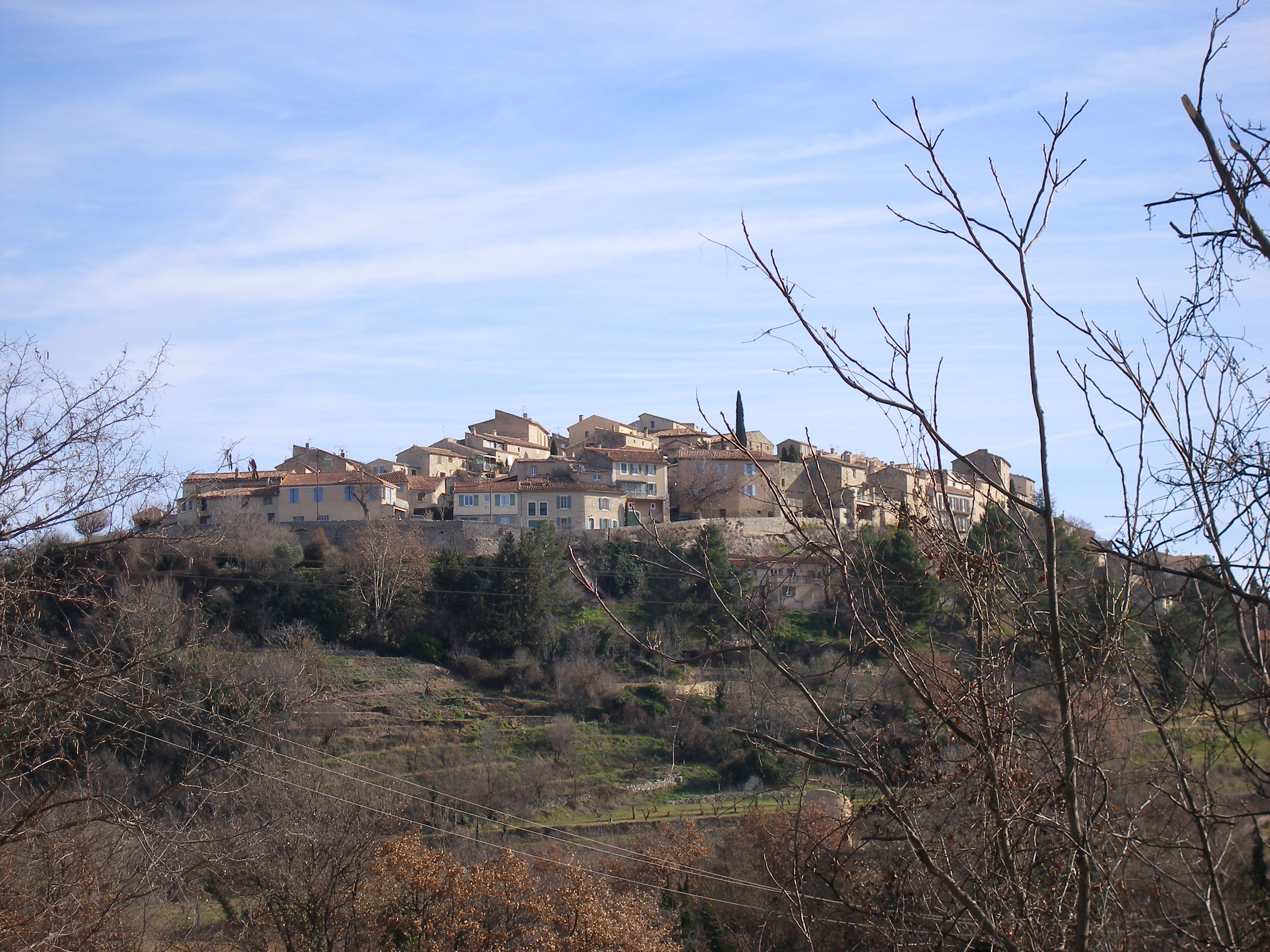
- A general view of Grambois

- Coat of arms
- Location of Grambois
- Location within France Location within Provence-Alpes-Côte d'Azur
- Coordinates: 43°45′47″N 5°35′22″E
- Country: France
- Region: Provence-Alpes-Côte d'Azur
- Department: Vaucluse
- Arrondissement: Apt
- Canton: Pertuis

Government
  - Mayor (2020–2026): Alain Ferretti
- Area^{1}: 31.46 km^{2} (12.15 sq mi)
- Elevation: 395 m (1,296 ft)
- Highest elevation: 628 m (2,060 ft)
- Lowest elevation: 278 m (912 ft)
- Population (2023): 1,234
  - Density: 39.22/km^{2} (101.6/sq mi)
- Time zone: UTC+01:00 (CET)
  - Summer (DST): UTC+02:00 (CEST)
- INSEE/Postal code: 84052 /84240
- ^{1} French Land Register data, which excludes lakes, ponds, glaciers > 1 km^{2} (0.386 sq mi or 247 acres) and river estuaries.

Grambois (French pronunciation: [ɡʁɑ̃bwa]; Occitan: Gramboés) is a commune in the Vaucluse department in the Provence-Alpes-Côte d'Azur region in southeastern France.

Grambois is a renovated, perched medieval village and quite close to the Luberon mountains. This small town was used for the filming La Gloire de mon père, which was released in 1990.

== See also ==
- Côtes du Luberon AOC
- Communes of the Vaucluse department
