= La Tour-d'Aigues =

La Tour-d'Aigues La Torre d'Egues (Occitan)
- Commune
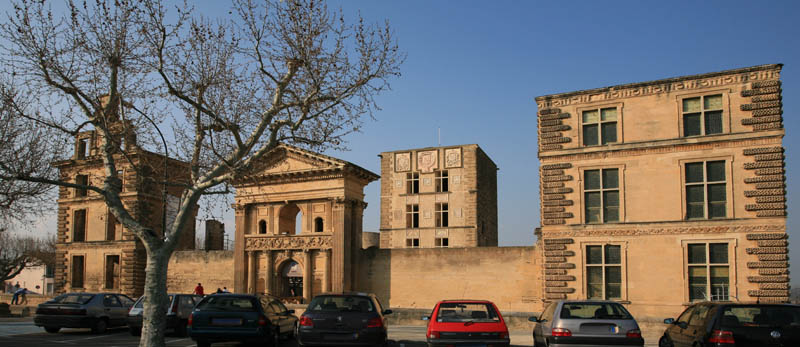
- Castle of La Tour-d'Aigues

- Coat of arms
- Location of La Tour-d'Aigues
- Location within France Location within Provence-Alpes-Côte d'Azur
- Coordinates: 43°43′34″N 5°32′55″E
- Country: France
- Region: Provence-Alpes-Côte d'Azur
- Department: Vaucluse
- Arrondissement: Apt
- Canton: Pertuis
- Intercommunality: CC Sud Luberon

Government
  - Mayor (2026–32): Jean-François Lovisolo (DVG)
- Area^{1}: 41.3 km^{2} (15.9 sq mi)
- Elevation: 270 m (890 ft)
- Highest elevation: 510 m (1,670 ft)
- Lowest elevation: 220 m (720 ft)
- Population (2023): 4,405
  - Density: 107/km^{2} (276/sq mi)
- Demonym: Tourains
- Time zone: UTC+01:00 (CET)
  - Summer (DST): UTC+02:00 (CEST)
- INSEE/Postal code: 84133 /84240
- Website: www.latourdaigues.fr
- ^{1} French Land Register data, which excludes lakes, ponds, glaciers > 1 km^{2} (0.386 sq mi or 247 acres) and river estuaries.

La Tour-d'Aigues (French pronunciation: [la tuʁ dɛɡ]; lit. 'The Tower of Aigues'; Occitan: La Torre d'Egues) is a commune in the Vaucluse department in the Provence-Alpes-Côte d'Azur region, Southeastern France.

== Geography ==
The town is located at the south of the Grand Luberon, 5 km (3.1 mi) away from Pertuis, which it borders. It is the capital town of the Pays d'Aigues (Land of Aigues).

=== Climate ===
La Tour d'Aigues is under the influence of the Mediterranean climate characterised by hot and dry summers and mild winters.

== History ==
=== Middle Ages ===
The town belonged to the counts of Forcalquier until the end of the 12th century, when it passed to the Sabran family through marriage, and later to the Agoults.

La Tour d'Aigues was partly destroyed in 1390 when facing the assault of Raymond VIII de Turenne. In addition to this, epidemics emptied the town of its population. This crisis allowed Fouquet d'Agoult to acquire new territories: le Tourel, la Bastidonne, Saint-Martin-de-la-Brasque, and Cabrière d'Aigues.

The Templars also had an establishment at La Tour d'Aigues.

=== Renaissance ===
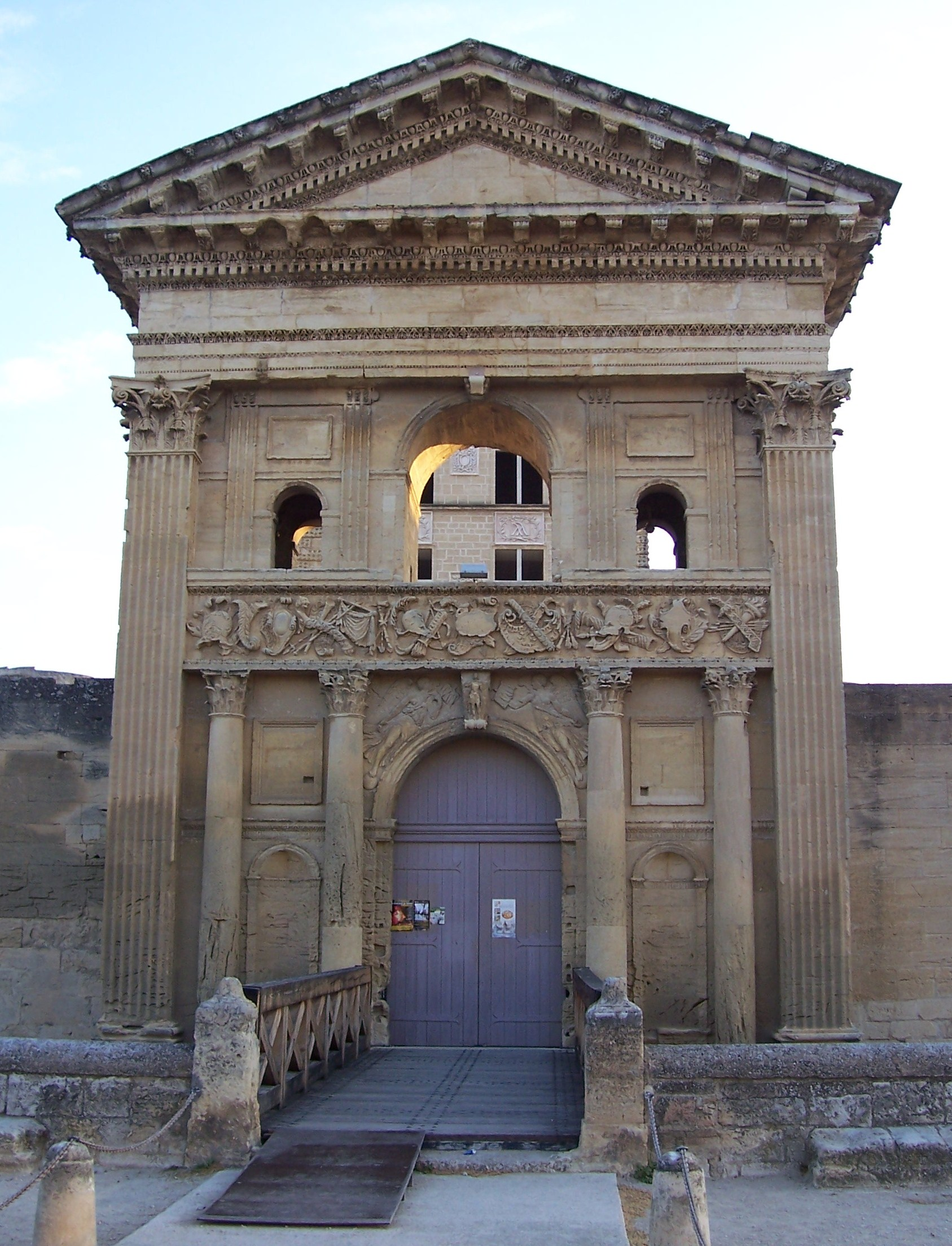
The front entrance of the Renaissance castle

Raymond d'Agoult, Fouquet d'Agoult's son, died without an heir in 1505. His sister Jeanne, wife of Antoine de Bolliers, viscount of Reillane, inherited La Tour d'Aigues. They brought farmers from their lands in Piémont to enrich the land. The town then passed on to the d'Agoult de Sault in 1584. It then belonged to the Lesdiguières, to a certain Villeroy in 1617, and, finally, to the Brunys in 1719 who were unpopular rich merchants from Marseille.

La Tour d'Aigues faced a devastating plague in 1630 and 1631.

=== Early Modern Period ===
When the Villeroys went bankrupt, they were forced to sell the Renaissance castle built by Nicolas de Bolliers in 1550 to Jean-Baptiste Bruny. His son, Jérôme Bruny, turned the castle into a museum.

== Population ==
Historical population
Year	Pop.	±% p.a.
1968	2,103	—
1975	2,070	−0.23%
1982	2,433	+2.34%
1990	3,328	+3.99%
1999	3,860	+1.66%
2007	3,915	+0.18%
2012	4,115	+1.00%
2017	4,287	+0.82%
2023	4,405	+0.45%
Source: INSEE

== Culture ==
=== Museums and sights ===
- Parc naturel régional du Luberon
- The Renaissance castle, entirely renovated in the 16th and 17th century. It burnt down before the French Revolution. Catherine de Médicis is said to have visited it in 1579.
- The Eglise Notre-Dame de Romégas which dates back to the 13th century.
- The Maison d'Estienne du Bourguet built from 1658 to 1671 with 17th-century murals.
- The Museum of earthenware in the cellars of the castle.

== Notable people ==
- Victor d'Hupay (1746–1818), writer and philosopher

== See also ==
- Côtes du Luberon AOC
- Communes of the Vaucluse department
- Luberon
