= Vachères =

- Commune
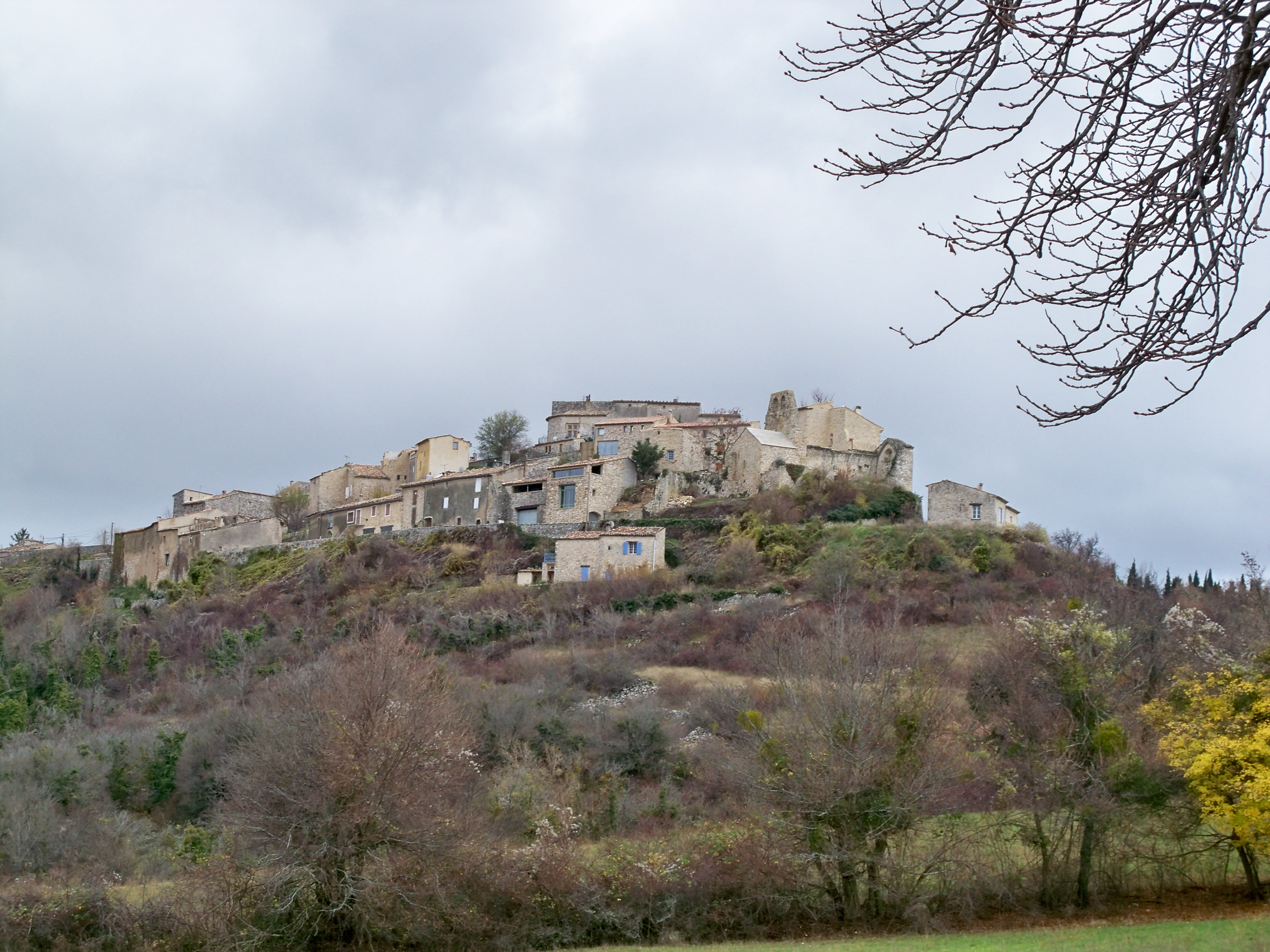
- A general view of the village of Vachères

- Coat of arms
- Location of Vachères
- Location within France Location within Provence-Alpes-Côte d'Azur
- Coordinates: 43°55′56″N 5°38′21″E
- Country: France
- Region: Provence-Alpes-Côte d'Azur
- Department: Alpes-de-Haute-Provence
- Arrondissement: Forcalquier
- Canton: Reillanne
- Intercommunality: Haute-Provence Pays de Banon

Government
  - Mayor (2026–32): Philipe Mulot
- Area^{1}: 23.42 km^{2} (9.04 sq mi)
- Elevation: 830 m (2,720 ft)
- Highest elevation: 865 m (2,838 ft)
- Lowest elevation: 499 m (1,637 ft)
- Population (2023): 332
  - Density: 14.2/km^{2} (36.7/sq mi)
- Time zone: UTC+01:00 (CET)
  - Summer (DST): UTC+02:00 (CEST)
- INSEE/Postal code: 04227 /04110
- ^{1} French Land Register data, which excludes lakes, ponds, glaciers > 1 km^{2} (0.386 sq mi or 247 acres) and river estuaries.

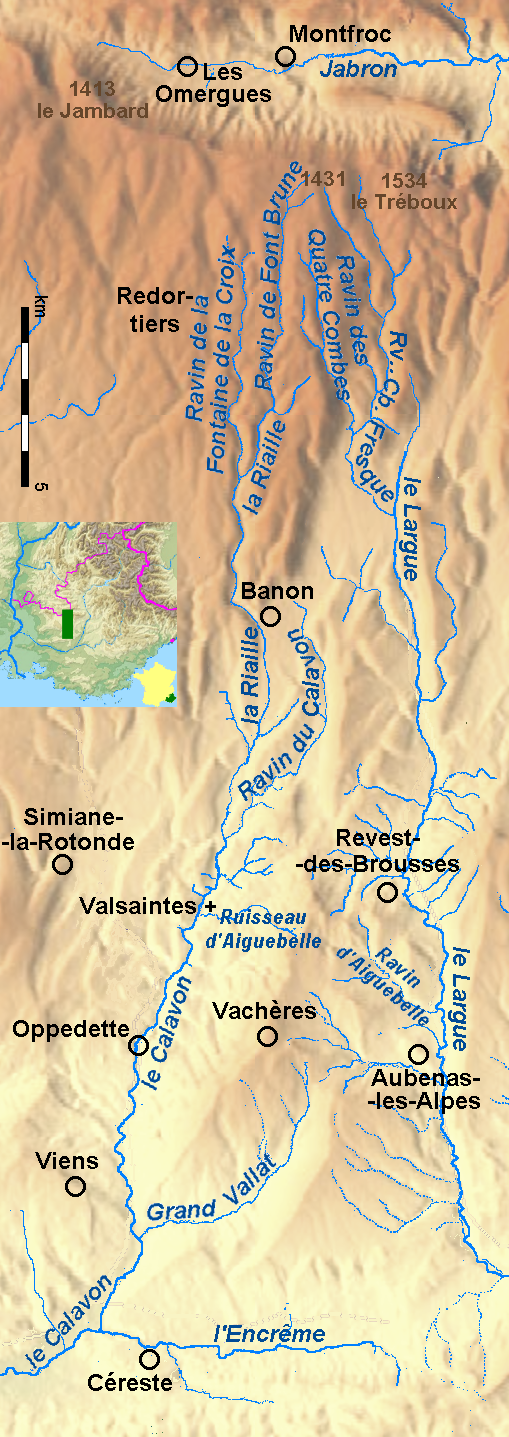
Vachères between the upper courses of river Calavon and river Largue

Vachères (French pronunciation: [vaʃɛʁ]; Occitan: Vachieras) is a commune in the Alpes-de-Haute-Provence department in the Provence-Alpes-Côte d'Azur region in southeastern France.

== Population ==
Historical population
Year	Pop.	±% p.a.
1968	142	—
1975	142	+0.00%
1982	171	+2.69%
1990	212	+2.72%
1999	257	+2.16%
2007	297	+1.82%
2012	265	−2.25%
2017	283	+1.32%
2023	332	+2.70%
Source: INSEE

== See also ==
- Luberon
- Communes of the Alpes-de-Haute-Provence department
