= Saint-Martin-de-Castillon =

- Commune
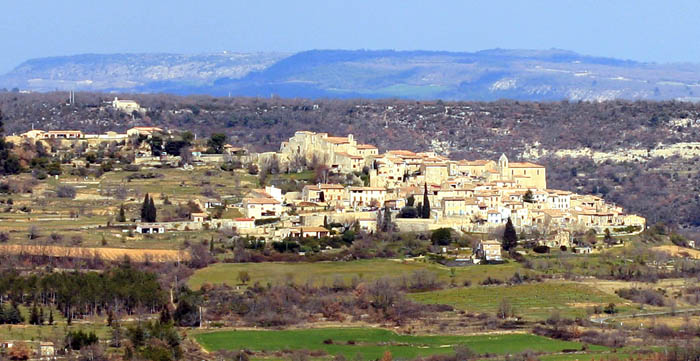
- A general view of Saint-Martin-de-Castillon

- Coat of arms
- Location of Saint-Martin-de-Castillon
- Location within France Location within Provence-Alpes-Côte d'Azur
- Coordinates: 43°51′37″N 5°30′45″E
- Country: France
- Region: Provence-Alpes-Côte d'Azur
- Department: Vaucluse
- Arrondissement: Apt
- Canton: Apt
- Intercommunality: Pays d'Apt-Luberon

Government
  - Mayor (2020–2026): Charlotte Carbonnel
- Area^{1}: 38.21 km^{2} (14.75 sq mi)
- Elevation: 486 m (1,594 ft)
- Highest elevation: 1,072 m (3,517 ft)
- Lowest elevation: 268 m (879 ft)
- Population (2023): 689
  - Density: 18.0/km^{2} (46.7/sq mi)
- Time zone: UTC+01:00 (CET)
  - Summer (DST): UTC+02:00 (CEST)
- INSEE/Postal code: 84112 /84750
- ^{1} French Land Register data, which excludes lakes, ponds, glaciers > 1 km^{2} (0.386 sq mi or 247 acres) and river estuaries.

Saint-Martin-de-Castillon (French pronunciation: [sɛ̃ maʁtɛ̃ də kastijɔ̃]; Occitan: Sant Martin de Castilhon) is a commune in the Vaucluse department in the Provence-Alpes-Côte d'Azur region in southeastern France.

== Geography ==
The river Calavon flows westward through the middle of the commune and forms part of its western border.

== Notable people ==
- Henri-Pierre Roché (28 May 1879 – 9 April 1959), French author, is buried here.

== See also ==
- Côtes du Luberon AOC
- Communes of the Vaucluse department
- Luberon
