= Beaumont-de-Pertuis =

- Commune
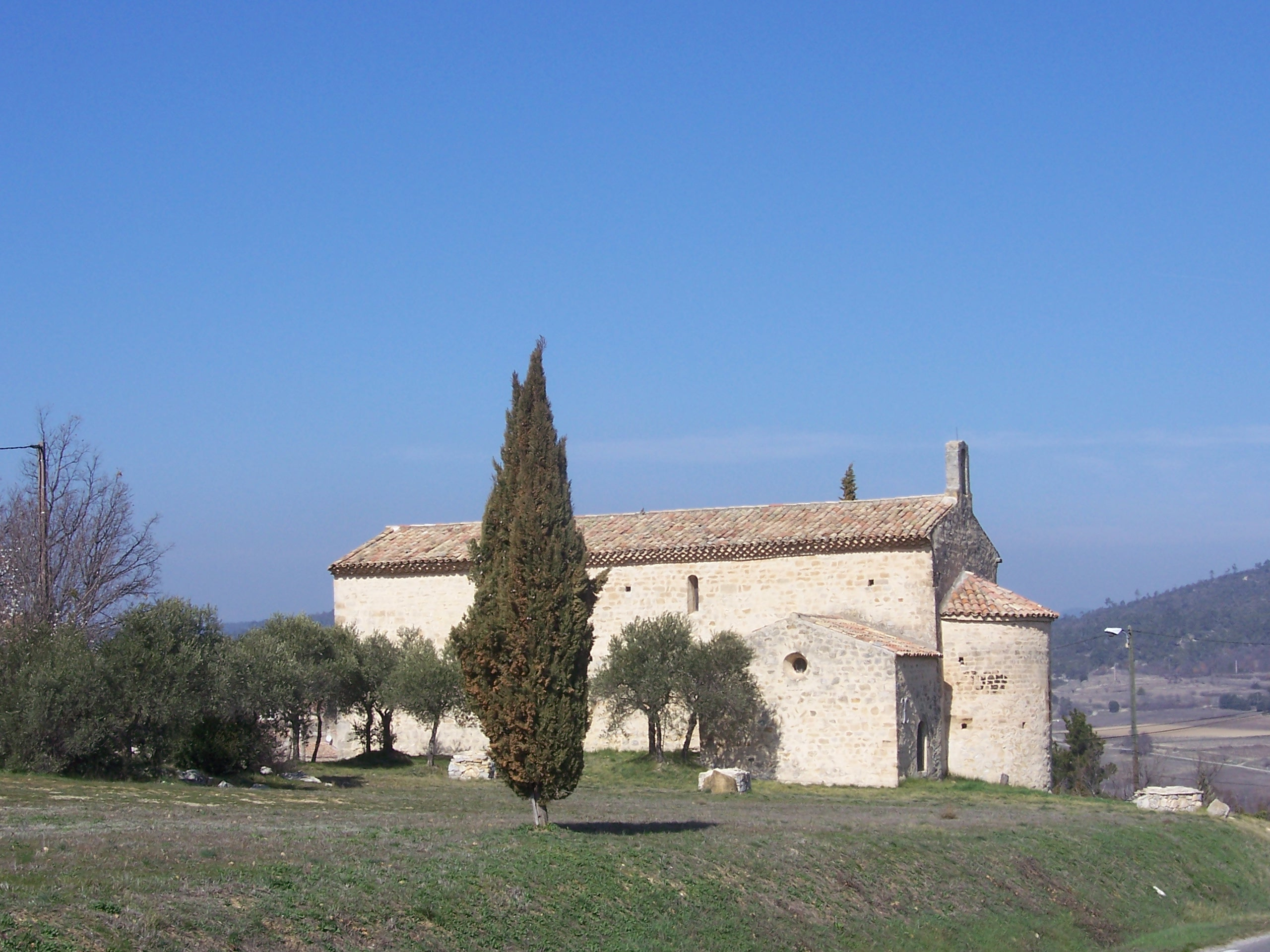
- Notre Dame de Beauvoir

- Coat of arms
- Location of Beaumont-de-Pertuis
- Location within France Location within Provence-Alpes-Côte d'Azur
- Coordinates: 43°44′18″N 5°41′21″E
- Country: France
- Region: Provence-Alpes-Côte d'Azur
- Department: Vaucluse
- Arrondissement: Apt
- Canton: Pertuis
- Intercommunality: CC Sud Luberon

Government
  - Mayor (2020–2026): Jacques Natta
- Area^{1}: 56.07 km^{2} (21.65 sq mi)
- Elevation: 524 m (1,719 ft)
- Highest elevation: 602 m (1,975 ft)
- Lowest elevation: 230 m (750 ft)
- Population (2023): 1,130
  - Density: 20.2/km^{2} (52.2/sq mi)
- Time zone: UTC+01:00 (CET)
  - Summer (DST): UTC+02:00 (CEST)
- INSEE/Postal code: 84014 /84120
- ^{1} French Land Register data, which excludes lakes, ponds, glaciers > 1 km^{2} (0.386 sq mi or 247 acres) and river estuaries.

Beaumont-de-Pertuis (French pronunciation: [bomɔ̃ də pɛʁtɥi], literally Beaumont of Pertuis; Occitan: Bèumont de Pertús) is a commune in the Vaucluse department in the Provence-Alpes-Côte d'Azur region in southeastern France.

Beaumont de Pertuis is a small village situated in the Parc Naturel du Luberon on the border of the Alpes de Haute Provence, the Var and the Bouches du Rhone. A busy road once ran through the middle of Beaumont de Pertuis which was at the time a prosperous medieval market town. In the 14th century, Beaumont had more than 1,000 inhabitants and belonged to one of the largest communes in France.

The first reference to Beaumont (Baùmoun, which means "cave" in Provençal dialect) dates back to 1079, a reference to the cave of Eucherius of Lyon. Before becoming archbishop this hermit went on retreat in a cave overhanging la Durance in the town of Beaumont de Pertuis. Later on, this cave became a pilgrimage site and a chapel was carved inside the mountain.

== Landmarks ==
- Saint Jean Baptiste Church
- Place de la Colonne
- Sainte Croix Chapel
- Notre Dame de Beauvoir Chapel
- Site of former castle
- Eucherius of Lyon Chapel

== See also ==
- Côtes du Luberon AOC
- Communes of the Vaucluse department
- Luberon
