= Peypin-d'Aigues =

- Commune
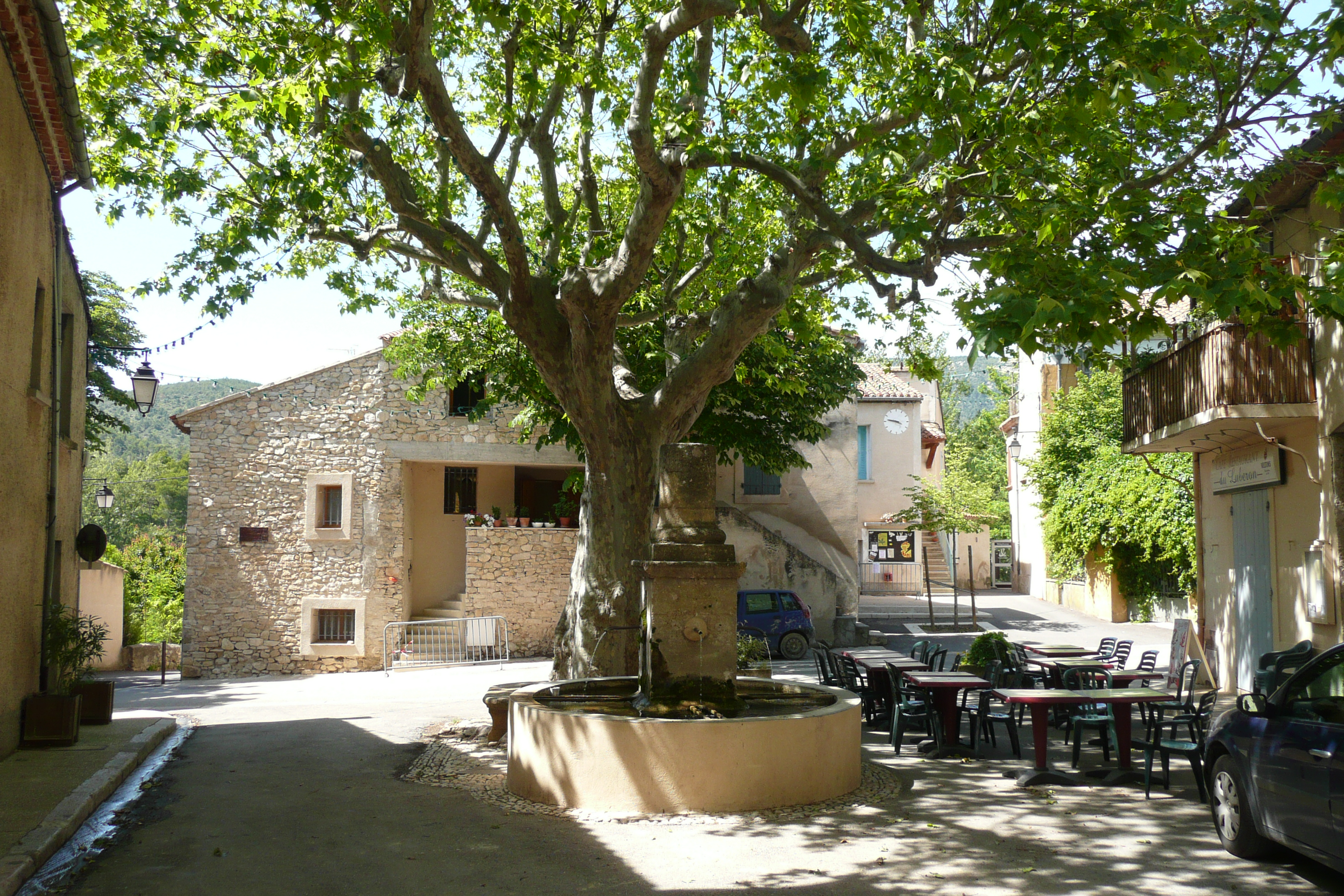
- The fountain in Peypin-d'Aigues

- Coat of arms
- Location of Peypin-d'Aigues
- Location within France Location within Provence-Alpes-Côte d'Azur
- Coordinates: 43°47′19″N 5°34′14″E
- Country: France
- Region: Provence-Alpes-Côte d'Azur
- Department: Vaucluse
- Arrondissement: Apt
- Canton: Pertuis
- Intercommunality: CC Sud Luberon

Government
  - Mayor (2020–2026): Karine Mouret
- Area^{1}: 17.36 km^{2} (6.70 sq mi)
- Elevation: 380 m (1,250 ft)
- Highest elevation: 1,040 m (3,410 ft)
- Lowest elevation: 349 m (1,145 ft)
- Population (2023): 664
  - Density: 38.2/km^{2} (99.1/sq mi)
- Time zone: UTC+01:00 (CET)
  - Summer (DST): UTC+02:00 (CEST)
- INSEE/Postal code: 84090 /84240
- ^{1} French Land Register data, which excludes lakes, ponds, glaciers > 1 km^{2} (0.386 sq mi or 247 acres) and river estuaries.

Peypin-d'Aigues (French pronunciation: [pepɛ̃ dɛɡ]; Occitan: Puègpin d'Egues) is a commune in the Vaucluse department in the Provence-Alpes-Côte d'Azur region in southeastern France.

== Population ==
Historical population
Year	Pop.	±% p.a.
1968	206	—
1975	221	+1.01%
1982	310	+4.95%
1990	385	+2.75%
1999	473	+2.31%
2007	595	+2.91%
2012	615	+0.66%
2017	674	+1.85%
2023	664	−0.25%
Source: INSEE

== See also ==
- Communes of the Vaucluse department
- Luberon
