= Sannes =

- Commune
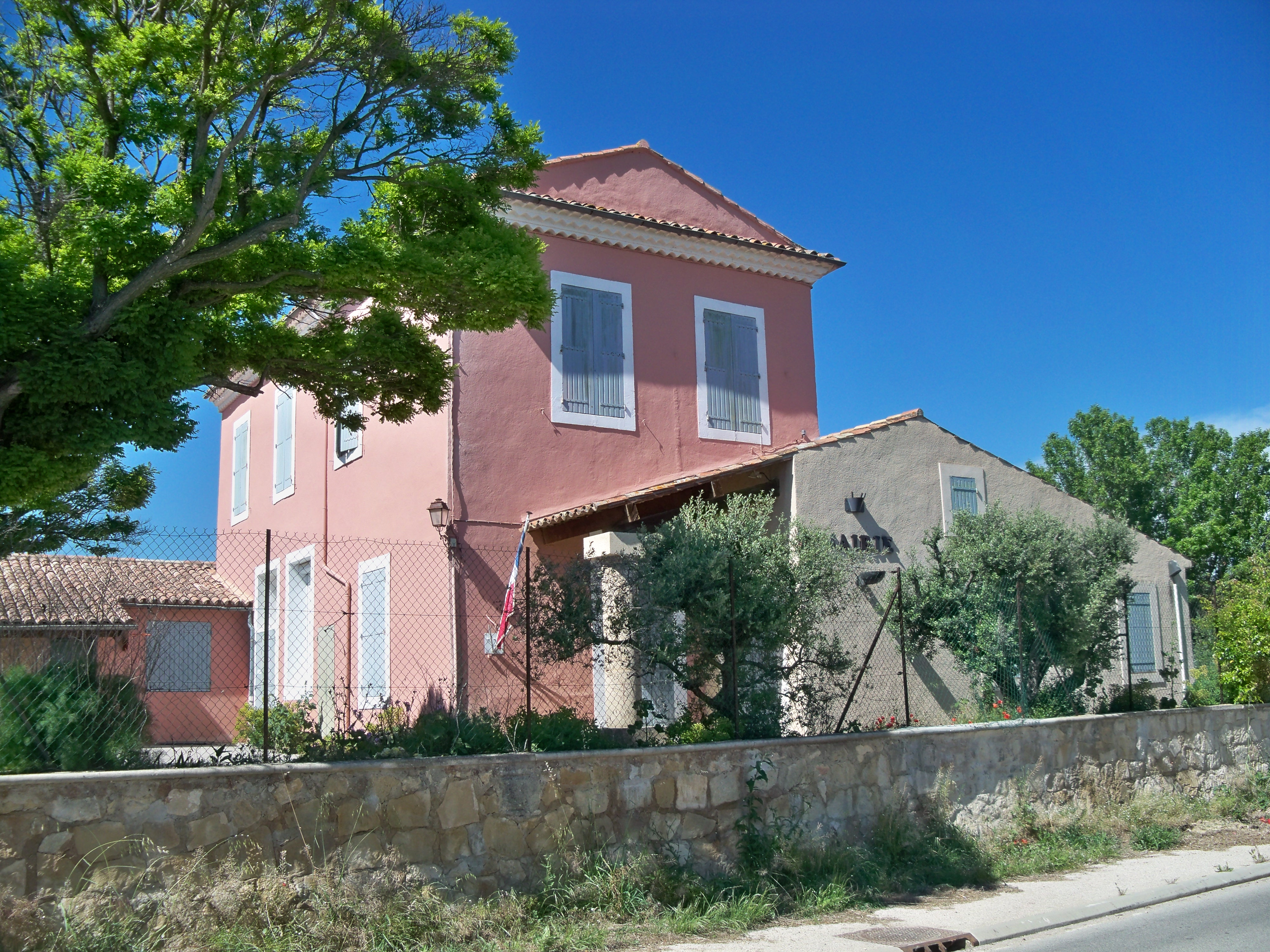
- Town hall

- Coat of arms
- Location of Sannes
- Location within France Location within Provence-Alpes-Côte d'Azur
- Coordinates: 43°45′29″N 5°29′27″E
- Country: France
- Region: Provence-Alpes-Côte d'Azur
- Department: Vaucluse
- Arrondissement: Apt
- Canton: Pertuis

Government
  - Mayor (2020–2026): Ève Maurel
- Area^{1}: 4.6 km^{2} (1.8 sq mi)
- Elevation: 330 m (1,080 ft)
- Highest elevation: 360 m (1,180 ft)
- Lowest elevation: 273 m (896 ft)
- Population (2023): 290
  - Density: 63/km^{2} (160/sq mi)
- Time zone: UTC+01:00 (CET)
  - Summer (DST): UTC+02:00 (CEST)
- INSEE/Postal code: 84121 /84240
- ^{1} French Land Register data, which excludes lakes, ponds, glaciers > 1 km^{2} (0.386 sq mi or 247 acres) and river estuaries.

Sannes (French pronunciation: [san]; Occitan: Çana) is a commune in the Vaucluse department in the Provence-Alpes-Côte d'Azur region in southeastern France.

== See also ==
- Côtes du Luberon AOC
- Communes of the Vaucluse department
- Luberon
