= La Bastidonne =

- Commune
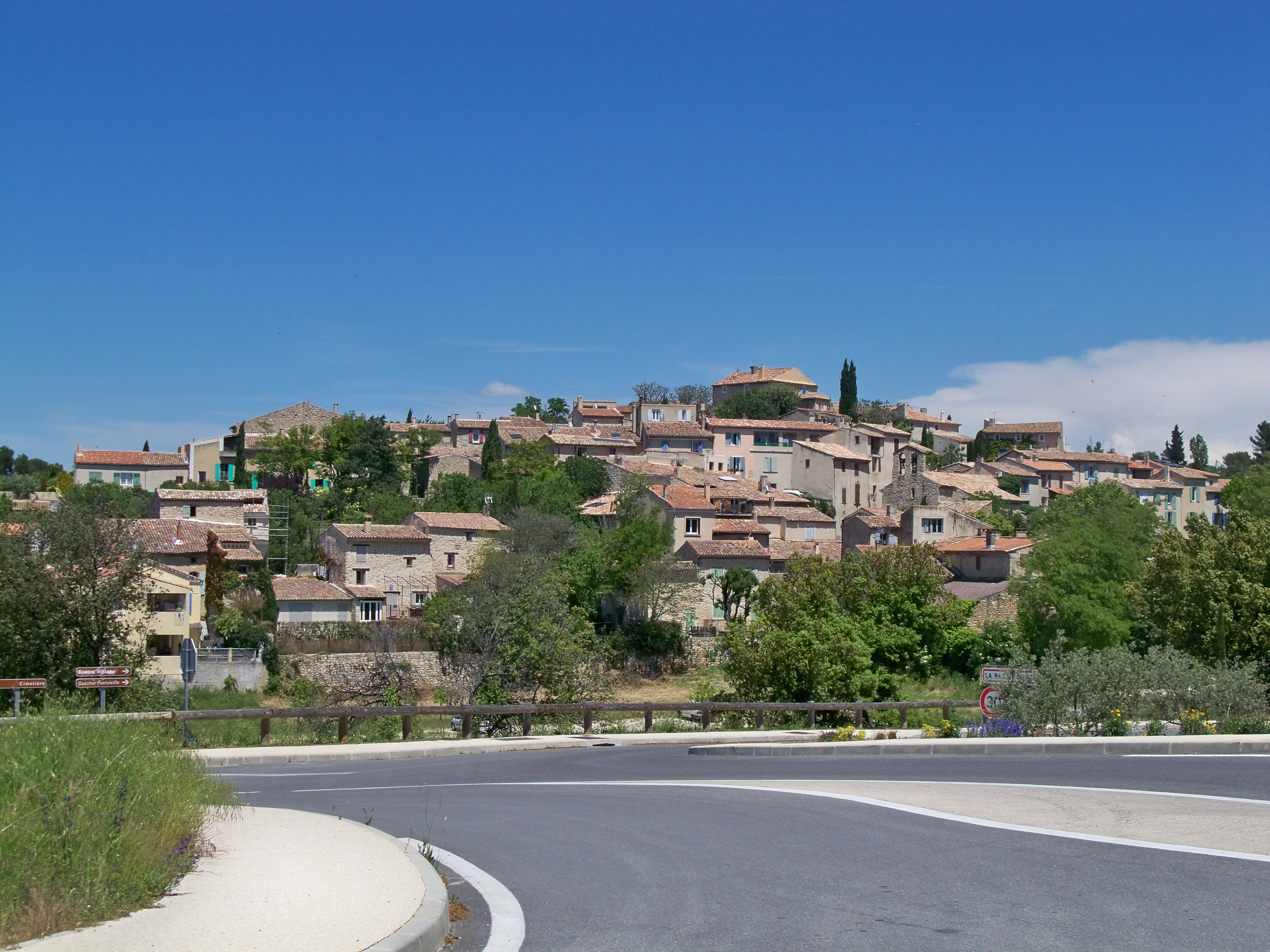
- The village of La Bastidonne

- Coat of arms
- Location of La Bastidonne
- Location within France Location within Provence-Alpes-Côte d'Azur
- Coordinates: 43°42′04″N 5°34′06″E
- Country: France
- Region: Provence-Alpes-Côte d'Azur
- Department: Vaucluse
- Arrondissement: Apt
- Canton: Pertuis

Government
  - Mayor (2020–2026): Michel Partage
- Area^{1}: 5.90 km^{2} (2.28 sq mi)
- Elevation: 350 m (1,150 ft)
- Highest elevation: 479 m (1,572 ft)
- Lowest elevation: 258 m (846 ft)
- Population (2023): 929
  - Density: 157/km^{2} (408/sq mi)
- Time zone: UTC+01:00 (CET)
  - Summer (DST): UTC+02:00 (CEST)
- INSEE/Postal code: 84010 /84120
- ^{1} French Land Register data, which excludes lakes, ponds, glaciers > 1 km^{2} (0.386 sq mi or 247 acres) and river estuaries.

La Bastidonne (French pronunciation: [la bastidɔn]; Occitan: La Bastidona) is a commune in the Vaucluse department in the Provence-Alpes-Côte d'Azur region in southeastern France.

== See also ==
- Côtes du Luberon AOC
- Communes of the Vaucluse department
- Luberon
