= La Bastide-des-Jourdans =

- Commune
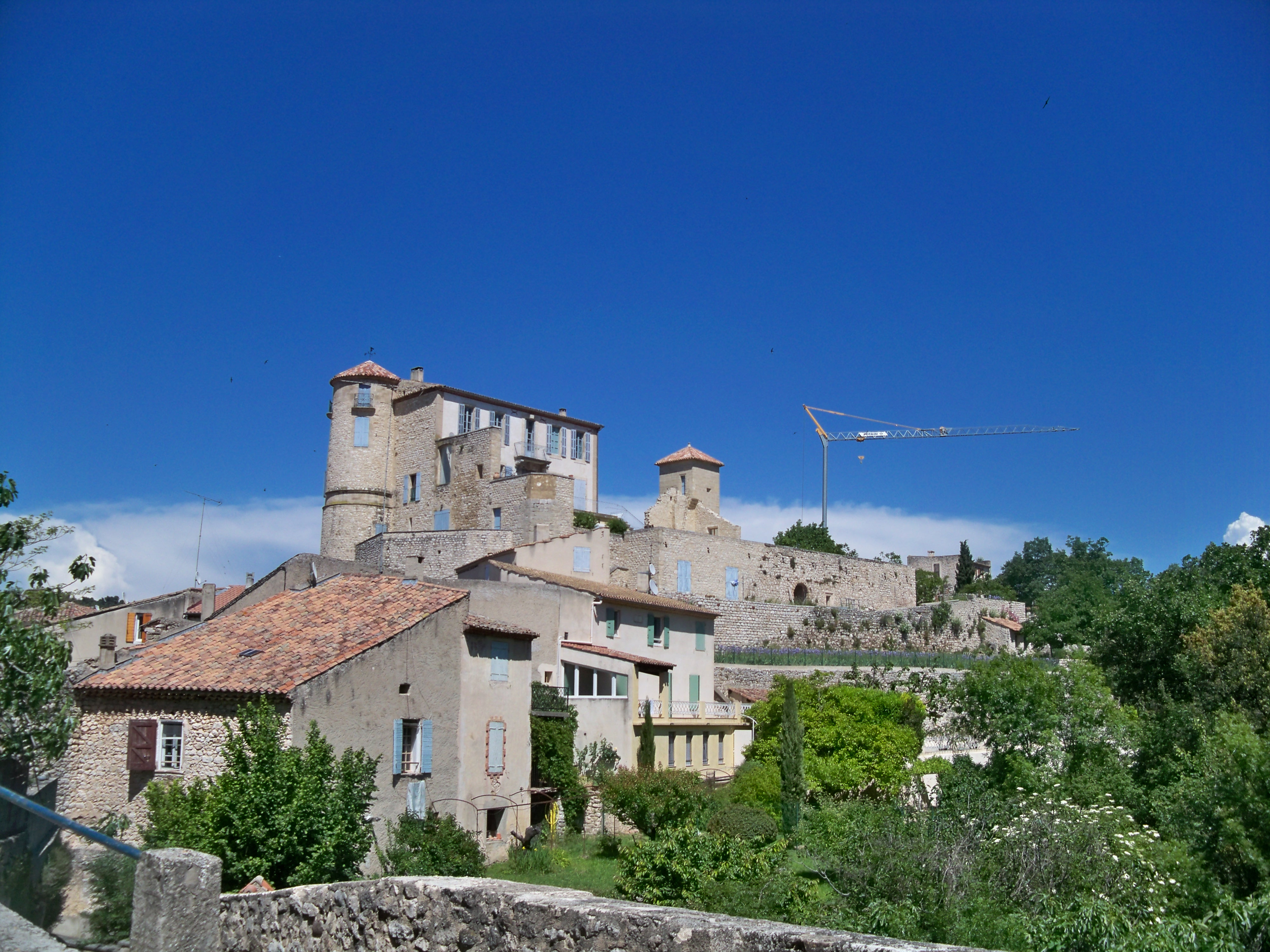
- A chateau in La Bastide-des-Jourdans

- Coat of arms
- Location of La Bastide-des-Jourdans
- Location within France Location within Provence-Alpes-Côte d'Azur
- Coordinates: 43°47′09″N 5°38′06″E
- Country: France
- Region: Provence-Alpes-Côte d'Azur
- Department: Vaucluse
- Arrondissement: Apt
- Canton: Pertuis
- Intercommunality: CC Sud Luberon

Government
  - Mayor (2020–2026): Séverine Maugan-Curnier
- Area^{1}: 27.74 km^{2} (10.71 sq mi)
- Elevation: 400 m (1,300 ft)
- Highest elevation: 725 m (2,379 ft)
- Lowest elevation: 348 m (1,142 ft)
- Population (2023): 1,760
  - Density: 63.4/km^{2} (164/sq mi)
- Time zone: UTC+01:00 (CET)
  - Summer (DST): UTC+02:00 (CEST)
- INSEE/Postal code: 84009 /84240
- ^{1} French Land Register data, which excludes lakes, ponds, glaciers > 1 km^{2} (0.386 sq mi or 247 acres) and river estuaries.

La Bastide-des-Jourdans (French pronunciation: [la bastid de ʒuʁdɑ̃]; Occitan: La Bastida dei Jordans) is a commune in the Vaucluse department in the Provence-Alpes-Côte d'Azur region in southeastern France.

== See also ==
- Côtes du Luberon AOC
- Communes of the Vaucluse department
