= Vitrolles-en-Luberon =

Vitrolles-en-Luberon Vitròla d'Aigas (Occitan)
- Commune
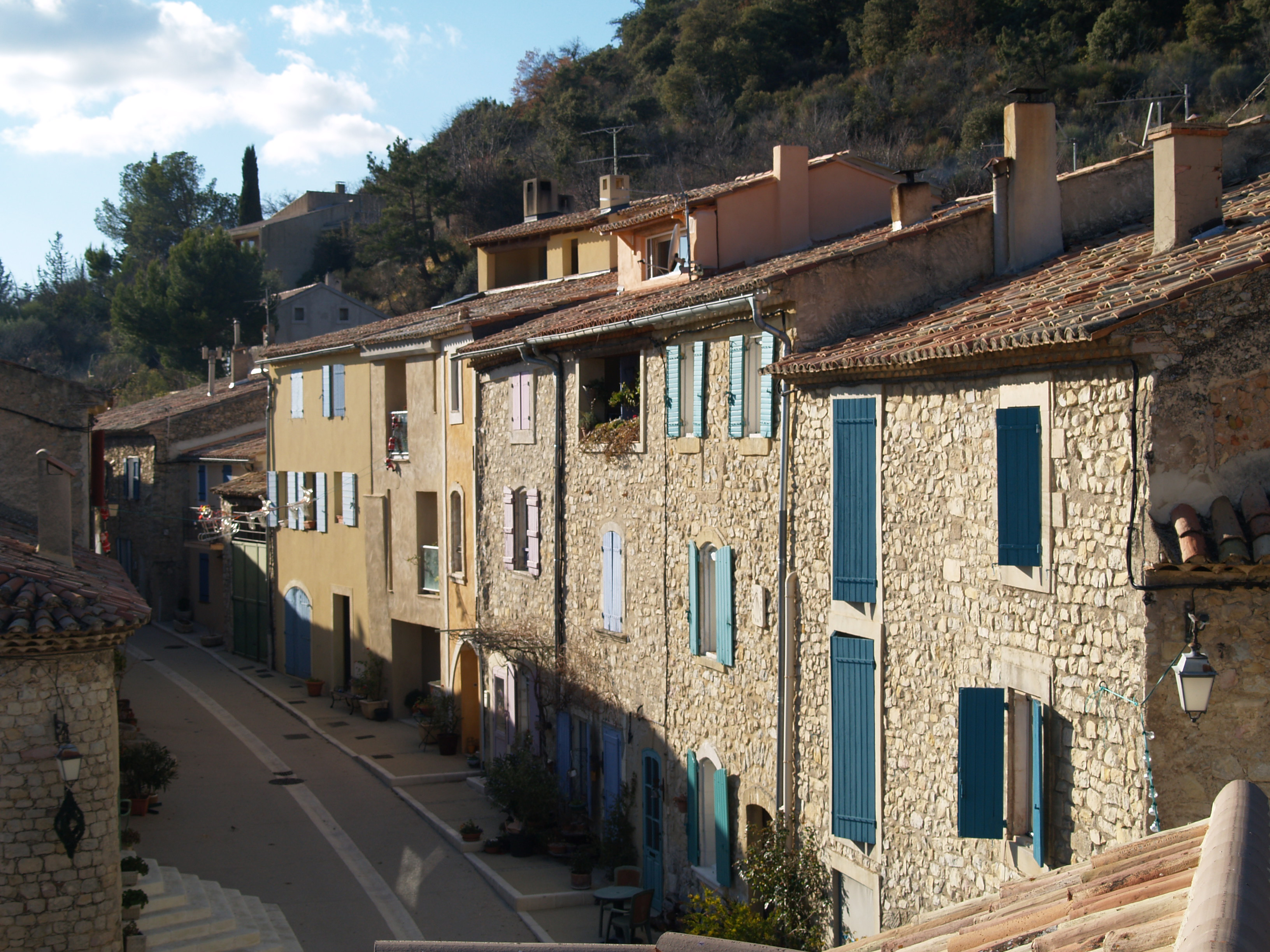
- The main road in Vitrolles-en-Luberon

- Coat of arms
- Location of Vitrolles-en-Luberon
- Location within France Location within Provence-Alpes-Côte d'Azur
- Coordinates: 43°48′43″N 5°35′45″E
- Country: France
- Region: Provence-Alpes-Côte d'Azur
- Department: Vaucluse
- Arrondissement: Apt
- Canton: Pertuis
- Intercommunality: CC Sud Luberon

Government
  - Mayor (2020–2026): Alain de Villebonne
- Area^{1}: 16.15 km^{2} (6.24 sq mi)
- Elevation: 650 m (2,130 ft)
- Highest elevation: 940 m (3,080 ft)
- Lowest elevation: 345 m (1,132 ft)
- Population (2023): 217
  - Density: 13.4/km^{2} (34.8/sq mi)
- Demonym: Vitrollains
- Time zone: UTC+01:00 (CET)
  - Summer (DST): UTC+02:00 (CEST)
- INSEE/Postal code: 84151 /84240
- Website: vitrolles-en-luberon.fr
- ^{1} French Land Register data, which excludes lakes, ponds, glaciers > 1 km^{2} (0.386 sq mi or 247 acres) and river estuaries.

Vitrolles-en-Luberon (French pronunciation: [vitʁɔl ɑ̃ lyb(ə)ʁɔ̃; -lybeʁɔ̃]; lit. 'Vitrolles-in-Luberon'; Occitan: Vitròla d'Aigas; until 1996, simply Vitrolles) is a rural commune in the Vaucluse department in the Provence-Alpes-Côte d'Azur region in southeastern France. It is in the south of the Grand Luberon, on the departmental border with Alpes-de-Haute-Provence.

== See also ==
- Côtes du Luberon AOC
- Communes of the Vaucluse department
- Luberon
