= Luberon =

Chain of mountains in Provence

Coordinates: 43°47′46″N 5°13′26″E

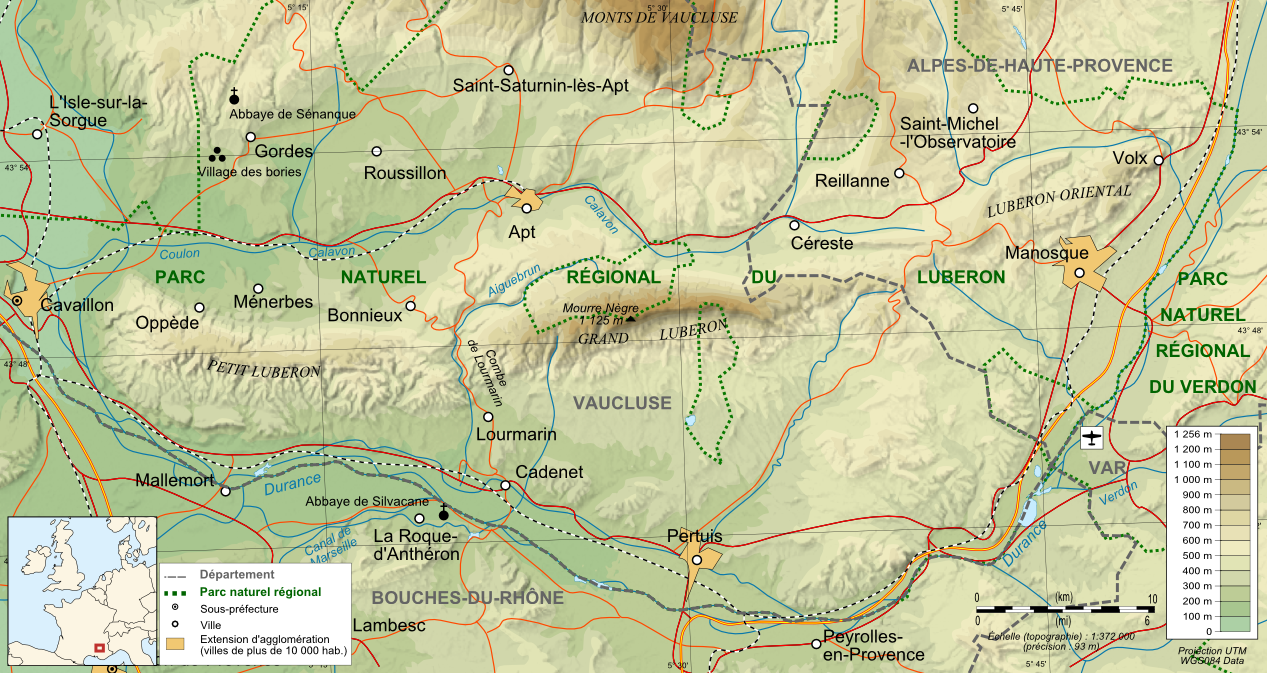
Map of the Luberon and its surroundings

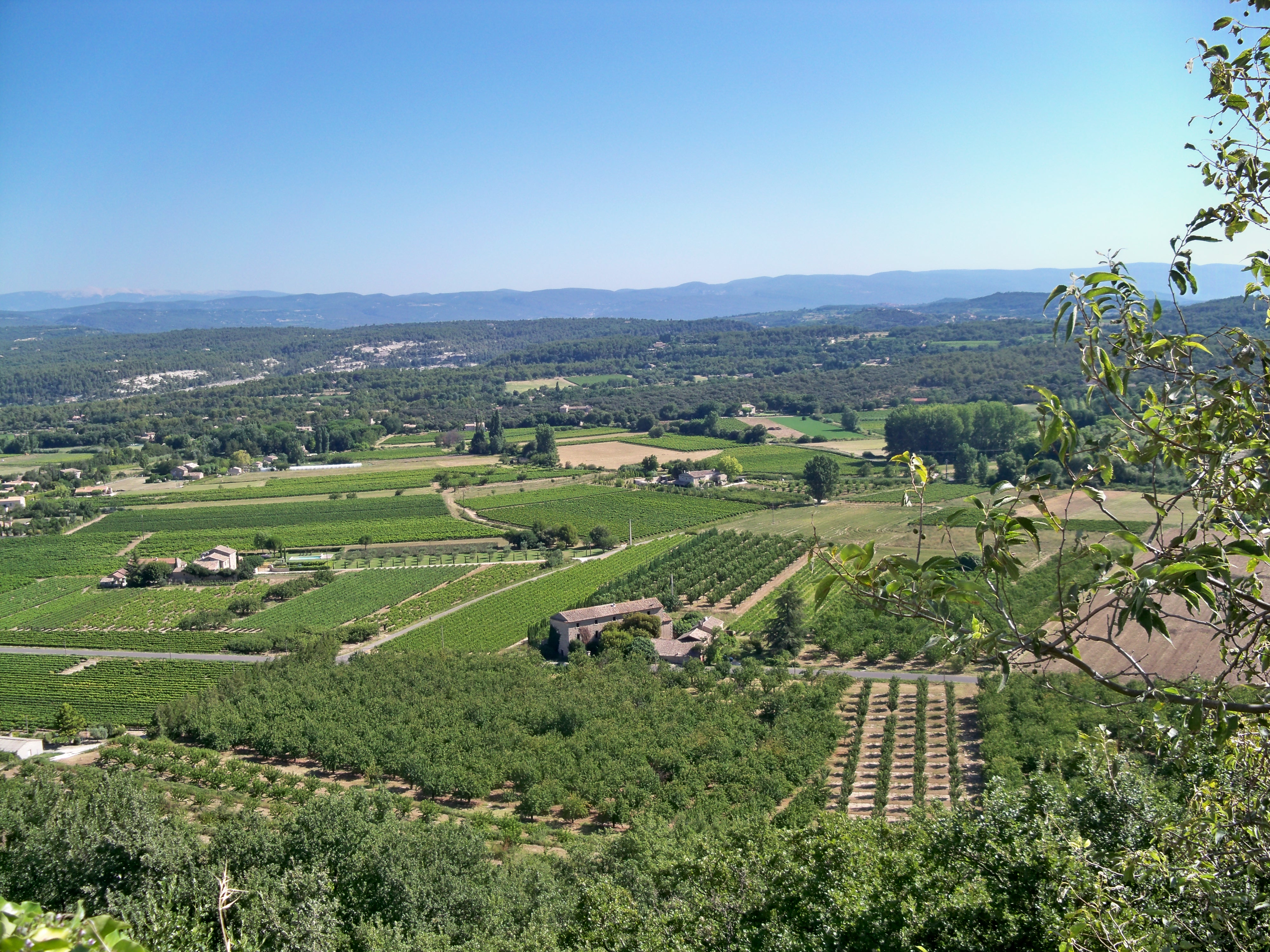
View of vineyards in the Luberon massif from the village of Ménerbes, Vaucluse

The Luberon (French pronunciation: [lyb(ə)ʁɔ̃] or [lybeʁɔ̃]; Provençal: Leberon (classical norm) or Leberoun (Mistralian norm)) is a massif in central Provence in Southern France, part of the French Prealps. It has a maximum elevation of 1,256 metres (4,121 ft) and an area of about 600 square kilometres (230 sq mi).

It is composed of three mountain ranges (from west to east): Lesser Luberon (Petit Luberon), Greater Luberon (Grand Luberon) and Eastern Luberon (Luberon oriental). The valleys north and south of them contain a number of towns and villages as well as agricultural land; the northern part is marked by the Calavon, while the southern part is characterised by the Durance.

The Luberon is often advertised under the name Lubéron (with an acute accent on the "e"); some dictionaries justify that the two spellings are interchangeable. The total number of inhabitants varies greatly between winter and summer, due to a massive influx of tourists during the warm season. It is a favourite destination for French high society and British and American visitors because of the pleasant and picturesque towns and villages, comfortable way of life, agricultural wealth, historical and cultural associations, as well as hiking trails. Samuel Beckett notably lived in Cave Bonelly, a vineyard near to Roussillon, during World War II.

In the last three decades the Luberon has become known in the English-speaking world especially through a series of books by British author Peter Mayle chronicling his life as an expatriate settled in the Luberon village of Ménerbes. These are titled A Year in Provence, Toujours Provence and Encore Provence. Another of Mayle's books, a novel set in the Luberon, was made into a film called A Good Year (2006) directed by Ridley Scott, starring Russell Crowe and filmed in the region.

== Flora and fauna ==
Luberon is particularly rich in biological diversity. There are known to be around 1,500 species of plants, accounting for 30% of the flora and fauna in France, 17,000 species and sub-species of insects with almost 2,300 species of Lepidoptera, or nearly 40% of species living in France, 341 species and subspecies of vertebrate wildlife, 135 species of birds and 21 species of bats or 70% of species present in France. Among the 1,500 different species of plants, there are 700 species and sub-species of higher plants and 200 species of lichens. Rich fossil deposits are also preserved here, documenting for example ancient species related to songbirds, as well as an ancestral pelican.

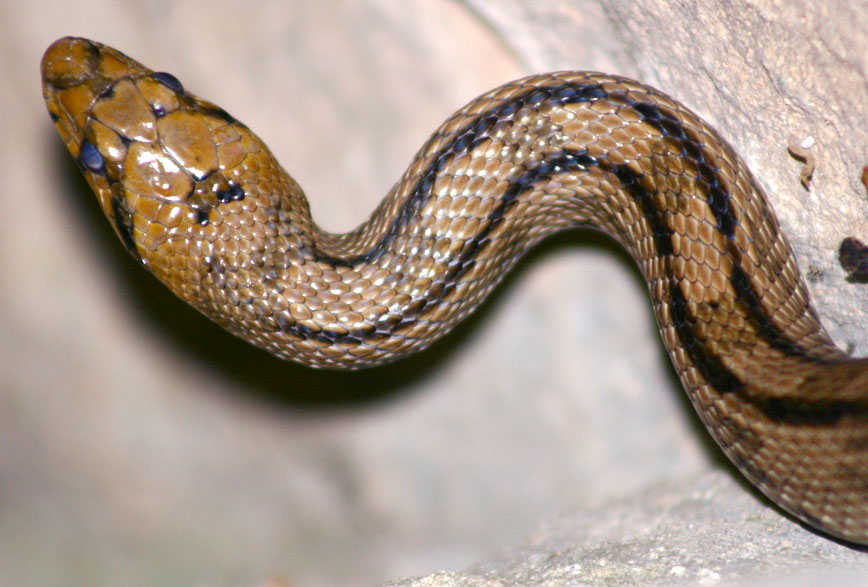
Ladder snake

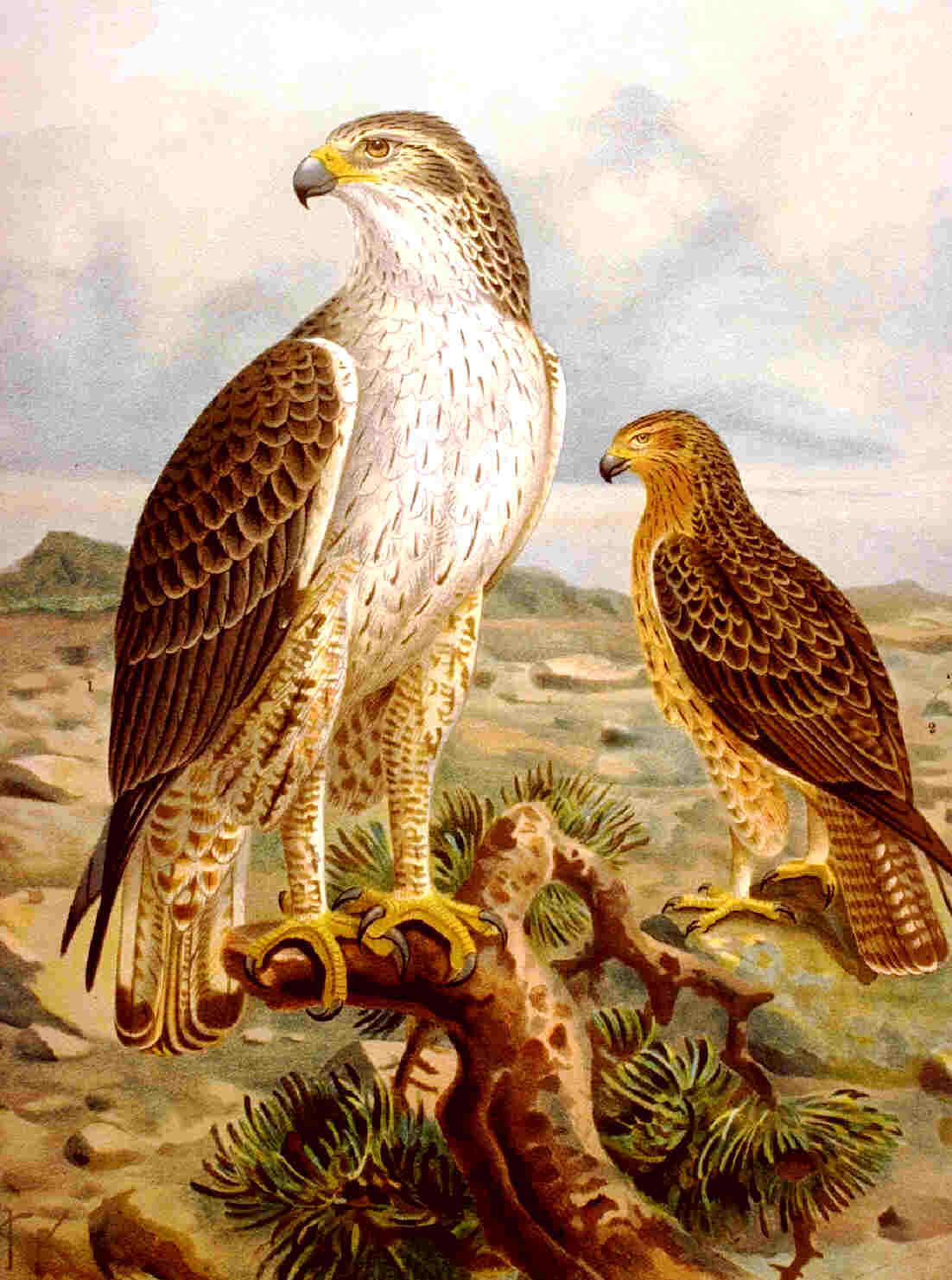
Bonelli's eagle

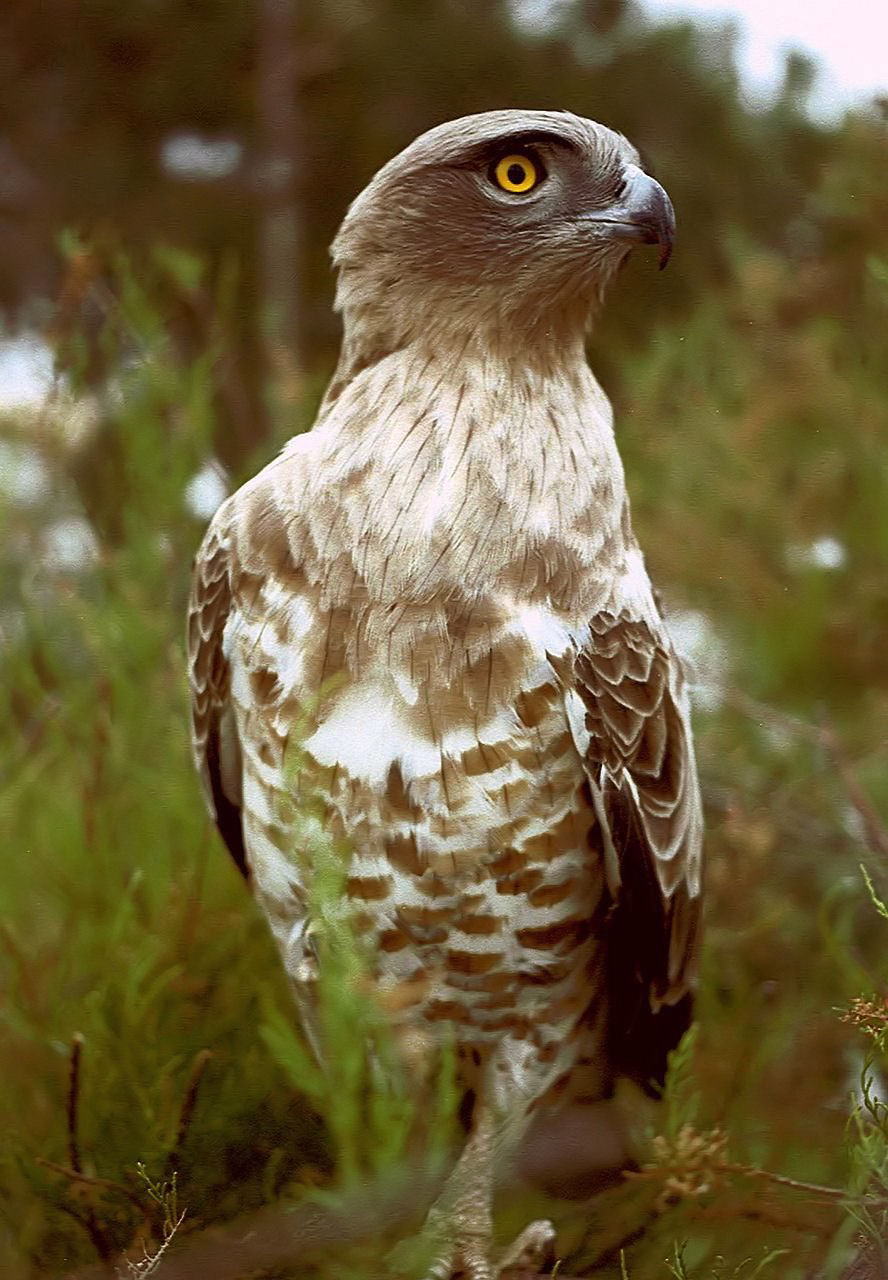
Short-toed snake eagle, the largest bird of prey of the Luberon

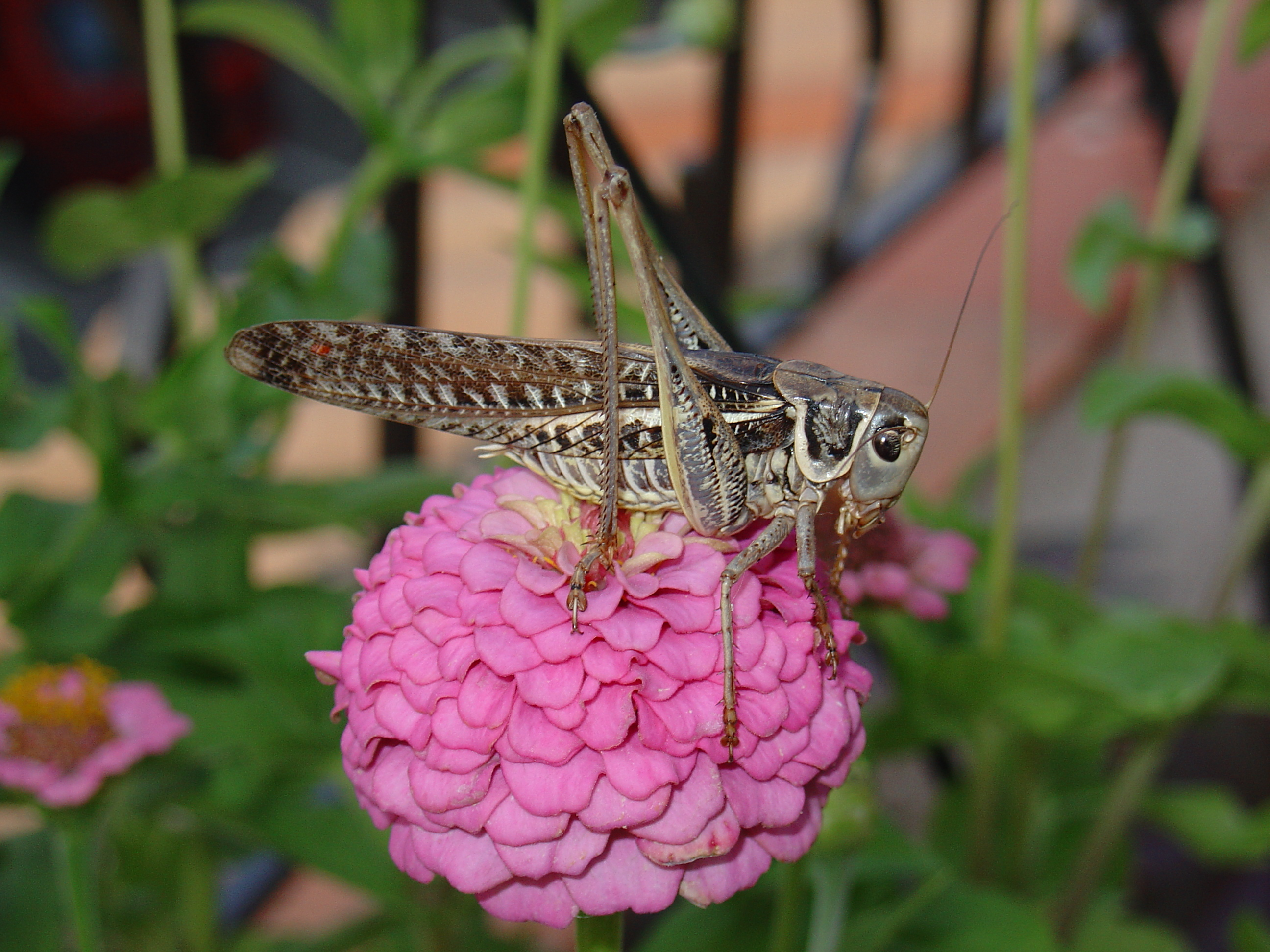
Southern Wartbiter

== Nuclear facilities ==
The Force de frappe or French strategic nuclear arsenal used to be located on the Plateau d'Albion before being dismantled in the late 1980s. Now, the underground site where the missile controls were located is a public multidisciplinary laboratory of the University of Nice Sophia Antipolis, the Low Noise Underground Laboratory (LSBB) of Rustrel, Pays d'Apt.

== Communes in the Parc naturel régional du Luberon ==
=== In Vaucluse ===
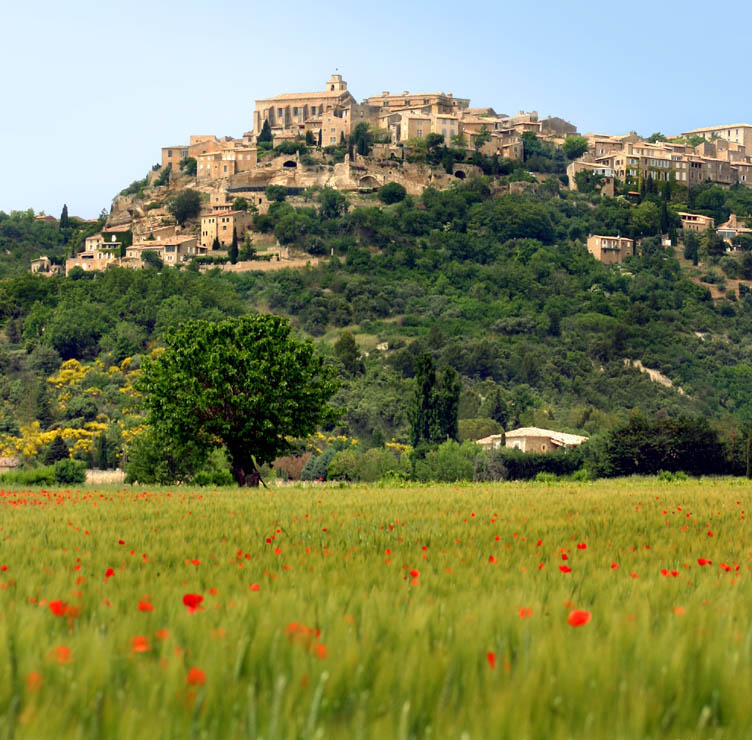
Gordes from the valley

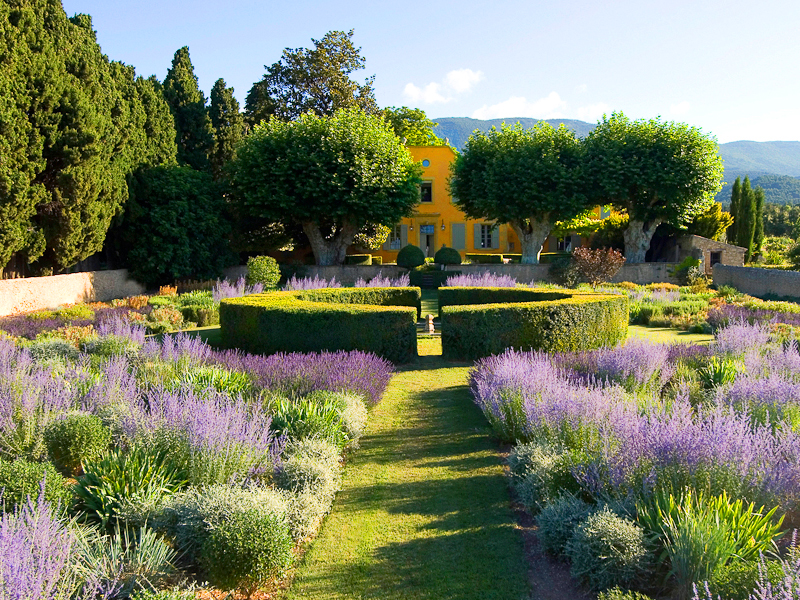
The contemporary garden "à la Française" in Provence: the Pavillon de Galon in Cucuron

- Ansouis
- Apt, small town near the eastern end of the Luberon valley
- La Bastide-des-Jourdans
- La Bastidonne
- Beaumettes
- Beaumont-de-Pertuis
- Bonnieux
- Buoux
- Cabrières-d'Aigues
- Cadenet
- Caseneuve
- Cavaillon, small town at the western entrance to the Luberon valley
- Cheval-Blanc
- Cucuron
- Gargas
- Gordes
- Goult
- Grambois
- Joucas
- Lacoste
- Lagarde-d'Apt
- Lauris
- Lioux
- Lourmarin
- Maubec
- Ménerbes
- Mérindol
- Mirabeau
- Murs
- Oppède
- Pertuis
- Peypin-d'Aigues
- Puget
- Puyvert
- Robion
- Roussillon
- Rustrel
- Saignon
- Saint-Martin-de-Castillon
- Saint-Martin-de-la-Brasque
- Saint-Pantaléon
- Saint-Saturnin-lès-Apt
- Sannes
- Taillades
- La Tour-d'Aigues
- Vaugines
- Viens
- Villars
- Villelaure
- Vitrolles-en-Luberon

=== In Alpes-de-Haute-Provence ===
- Aubenas-les-Alpes
- La Brillanne
- Céreste
- Dauphin
- Forcalquier
- Limans
- Lurs
- Manosque
- Montfuron
- Montjustin
- Niozelles
- Oppedette
- Pierrerue
- Pierrevert
- Reillanne
- Revest-des-Brousses
- Saint-Maime
- Saint-Martin-les-Eaux
- Saint-Michel-l'Observatoire
- Sainte-Tulle
- Vachères
- Villemus
- Villeneuve
- Volx

== Golden triangle of Luberon ==
- Bonnieux, village on the border between the Little and Big Luberon
- Gordes, facing the Luberon, this village is considered the top of the Golden Triangle (the base being made by the Little Luberon mountains)
- Goult, perched on a hill in the middle of the valley of the Luberon
- Lacoste and the ancient castle of the uncle of "le Marquis de Sade"
- Ménerbes
- Oppède with its historic section perched on the hillside Oppède-le-Vieux
- Roussillon, like Goult, perched on a hill within the Luberon valley

=== Southern Luberon ===
- Lourmarin, village on the border between Little and Big Luberon
- Cucuron
- Pavillon de Galon
