= Canton of Pertuis =

Coordinates: 43°45′11″N 5°33′43″E

Pertuis
- Canton
- Country: France
- Region: Provence-Alpes-Côte d'Azur
- Department: Vaucluse
- No. of communes: {{{nbcomm}}}
- Area: 373.32 km^{2} (144.14 sq mi)
- Population (2023): 39,278
  - Density: 105.21/km^{2} (272.50/sq mi)
- INSEE code: 84 13

The canton of Pertuis is a French administrative division in the department of Vaucluse and region Provence-Alpes-Côte d'Azur.

== Composition ==
At the French canton reorganisation which came into effect in March 2015, the canton was expanded from 14 to 15 communes:

- Ansouis
- La Bastide-des-Jourdans
- La Bastidonne
- Beaumont-de-Pertuis
- Cabrières-d'Aigues
- Grambois
- Mirabeau
- La Motte-d'Aigues
- Pertuis
- Peypin-d'Aigues
- Saint-Martin-de-la-Brasque
- Sannes
- La Tour-d'Aigues
- Villelaure
- Vitrolles-en-Luberon
