= Canton of Cadenet =

Coordinates: 43°45′19″N 5°21′04″E

Cadenet
- Former canton
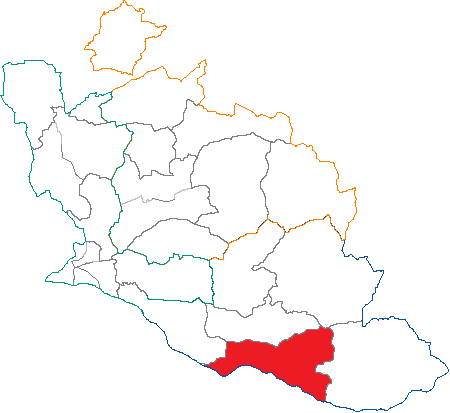
- Country: France
- Region: Provence-Alpes-Côte d'Azur
- Department: Vaucluse
- No. of communes: {{{nbcomm}}}
- Disbanded: 2015
- Area: 189.97 km^{2} (73.35 sq mi)
- Population (2012): 18,006
  - Density: 94.783/km^{2} (245.49/sq mi)

The canton of Cadenet is a French former administrative division in the department of Vaucluse and region Provence-Alpes-Côte d'Azur. It had 18,006 inhabitants (2012). It was disbanded following the French canton reorganisation which came into effect in March 2015.

The canton comprised the following communes:

- Cadenet
- Cucuron
- Lauris
- Lourmarin
- Mérindol
- Puget
- Puyvert
- Vaugines
- Villelaure
