= Didier Pillet =

French journalist (1948–2026)

- Born: 9 September 1948; Rouen, France
- Died: 11 May 2026 (aged 77); Lagnes, France
- Occupation: Journalist

Didier Pillet (French: [didjˈe pijˈɛ]; 9 September 1948 – 11 May 2026) was a French journalist.

Pillet was notably editor-in-chief of La Provence from 1989 to 1991 and of Ouest-France from 1991 to 2005. From 2008 to 2010, he headed the southern division of Groupe Hersant Média.

Pillet died in Lagnes on 11 May 2026, at the age of 77.

== Distinctions ==
- Knight of the Ordre national du Mérite (2006)
- Knight of the Legion of Honour (2009)
