= Cabrières-d'Avignon =

- Commune
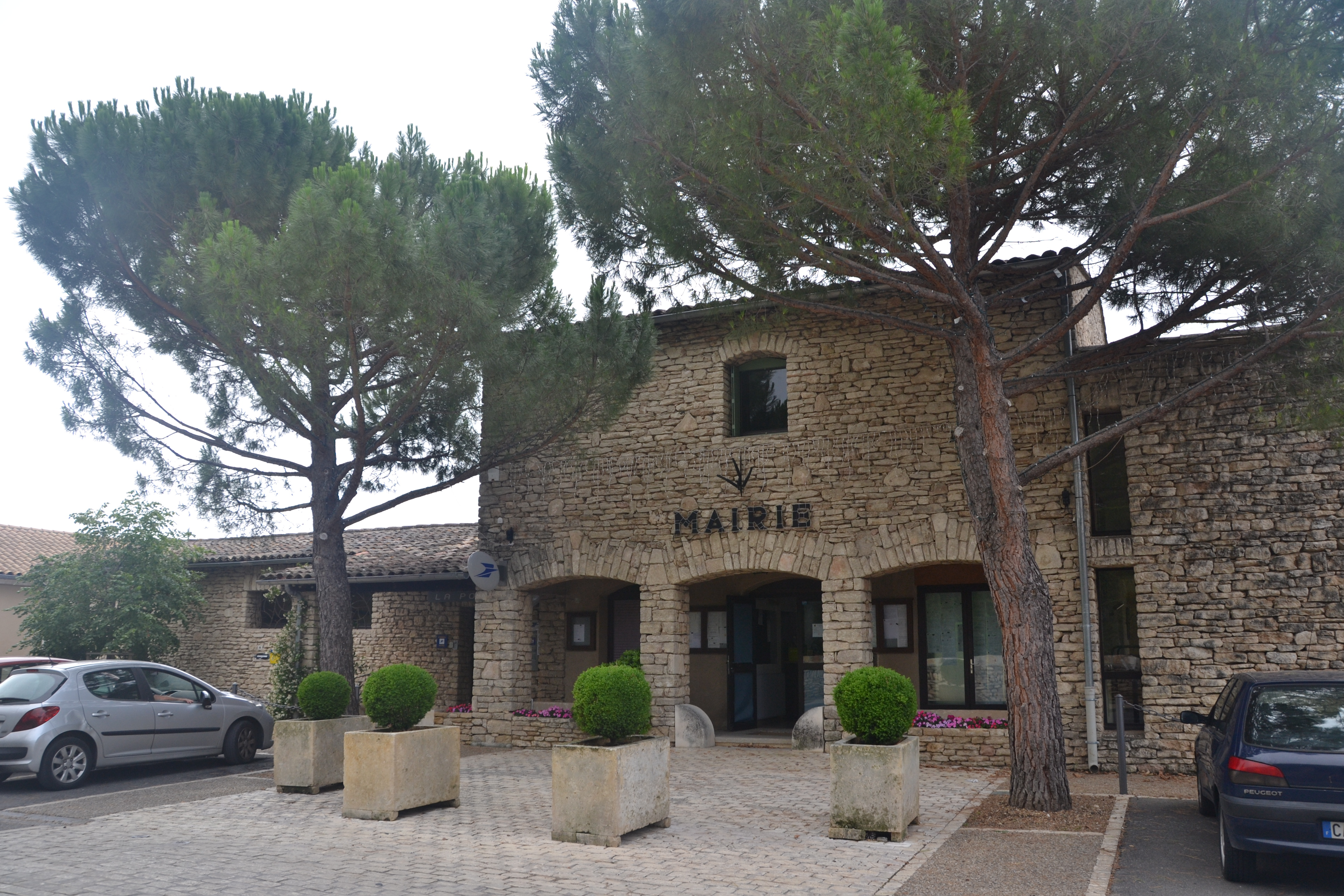
- The town hall of Cabrières-d'Avignon

- Coat of arms
- Location of Cabrières-d'Avignon
- Location within France Location within Provence-Alpes-Côte d'Azur
- Coordinates: 43°53′34″N 5°09′00″E
- Country: France
- Region: Provence-Alpes-Côte d'Azur
- Department: Vaucluse
- Arrondissement: Apt
- Canton: Cheval-Blanc
- Intercommunality: CA Luberon Monts de Vaucluse

Government
  - Mayor (2020–2026): Delphine Cresp
- Area^{1}: 14.68 km^{2} (5.67 sq mi)
- Elevation: 190 m (620 ft)
- Highest elevation: 626 m (2,054 ft)
- Lowest elevation: 105 m (344 ft)
- Population (2023): 1,686
  - Density: 114.9/km^{2} (297.5/sq mi)
- Time zone: UTC+01:00 (CET)
  - Summer (DST): UTC+02:00 (CEST)
- INSEE/Postal code: 84025 /84220
- ^{1} French Land Register data, which excludes lakes, ponds, glaciers > 1 km^{2} (0.386 sq mi or 247 acres) and river estuaries.

Cabrières-d'Avignon (French pronunciation: [kabʁijɛʁ daviɲɔ̃]; Occitan: d'Avinhon) is a commune in the Vaucluse department in the Provence-Alpes-Côte d'Azur region in southeastern France.

== History ==
The Château and the village were the scene of the massacre in 1545 of about 700 Vaudois, or Waldensians—a reformist group declared heretical by the Catholic church. Men, women, and children were tortured and killed. The events are known as the Massacre of Mérindol, after the campaign which began in nearby Mérindol and resulted in the destruction of between 22 and 28 villages.

== See also ==
- Communes of the Vaucluse department
