= Joseph-François Garnier =

French musician (1755–1825)

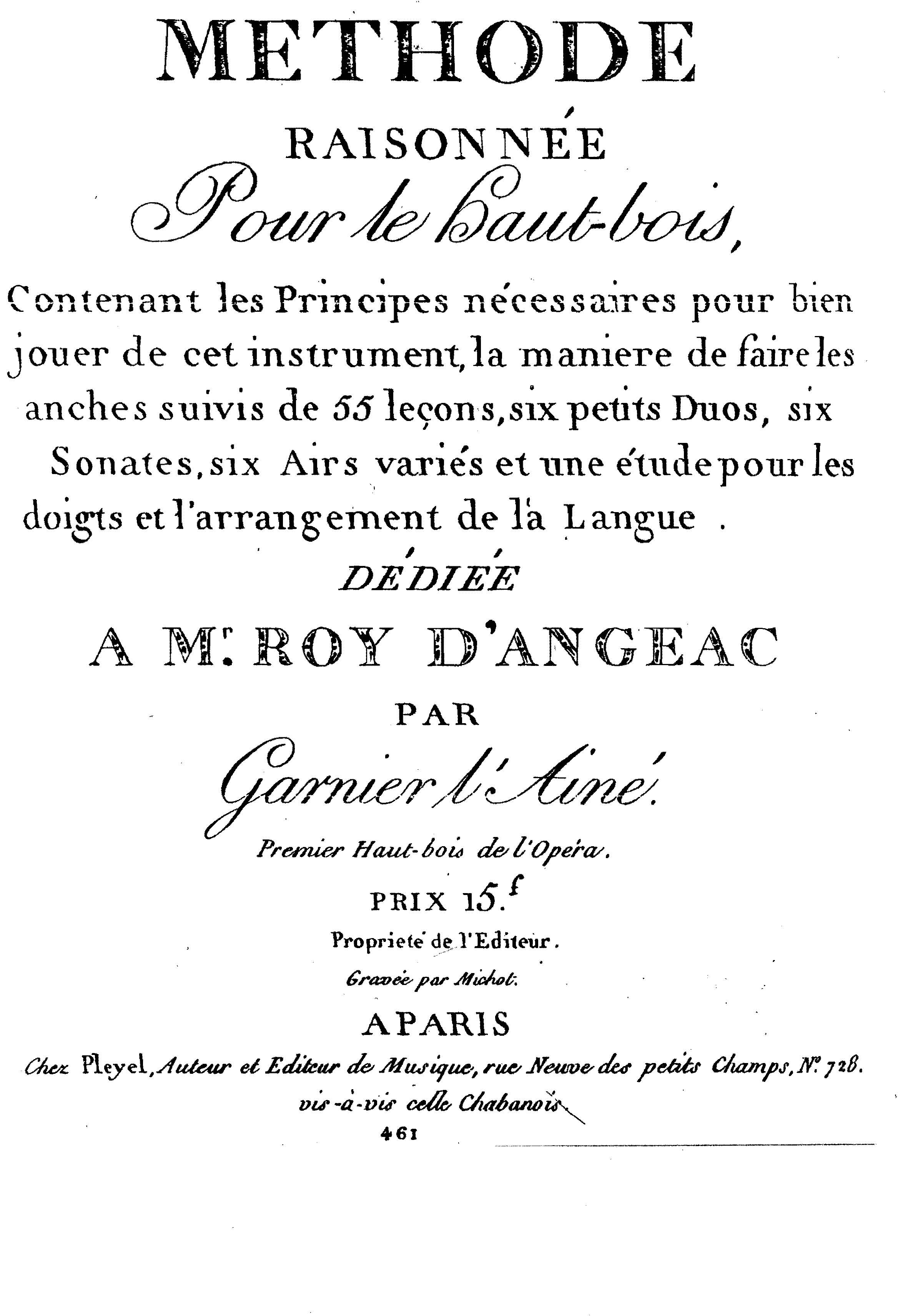
Méthode raisonnée by Joseph François Garnier, 1798

Joseph-François Garnier (18 June 1755 – 31 March 1825) was a French oboist and composer.

== Life ==
Joseph-François Garnier was born in 1755 in Lauris, Vaucluse, to a family of modest means. His father was a shoe-maker in the Place Jean d'Autan. His uncle was a bassoonist, who brought him to Paris to learn the oboe. In 1769 Garnier joined the orchestra of the Royal Academy of Music (which was to become the National Opera of Paris after the Revolution), playing oboe and flute. Over the course of his long career with this orchestra, from 1775 to 1808, Garnier earned a grand reputation also for performing at the Concert Spirituel public concert series from 1787 to 1791 as solo oboist, occasionally in performances of his own compositions.

From 1792, he taught oboe at the National Guard where he became friends with the violinist Rodolphe Kreutzer, who dedicated his oboe concerto to Garnier and with whom Garnier gave the concerto's first performance. Garnier joined the National Conservatory of Music (founded by the Convention) in 1795, where he was one of five professors of oboe (along with Bernard Delcambre, Gebauer, François Félix-Miolan and François Sallantin. Garnier was dominant at the Conservatoire; he was "the savior of the French school of oboe during the Revolution."

As oboist and flautist with the Paris Opera, Garnier participated in the premiere performances of many of the works of Grétry, Méhul, Gluck, Cherubini and Gossec, each under the composer's own direction. He also participated in the French-language premieres of many of Mozart's works, including Les Noces de Figaro, Don Juan and La Flûte enchantée.

A virtuoso on his instrument and as a composer, he was also an acclaimed teacher, and published a Méthode raisonnée pour le hautbois in 1798, published by Pleyel. It is reported that he was also a member of various Masonic lodges.

Music critic Jacques Rouchouse wrote a biography of Garnier in 2003. Oboist Claude Villevieille is largely responsible for the reintroduction of Garnier's concert works into the public awareness. Villevieille has said that Garnier may be considered "the first French theorist of the instrument".

His son, also named Joseph François (1796–1865), was a medical doctor and mayor of Neuilly (1843–1848).

Garnier died in Paris on 31 March 1825. His place of burial is unknown. His home town of Lauris named its school of music in his honour on 25 April 2010.

== Compositions ==
- Symphonies concertante for two oboes.
- Concerto for oboe and orchestra.
- Sonatas, duo concertos and duets for two oboes, for oboe and clarinet, for oboe and bassoon and for oboe and violin.

== See also ==
Oboist
