= Cucuron =

- Commune
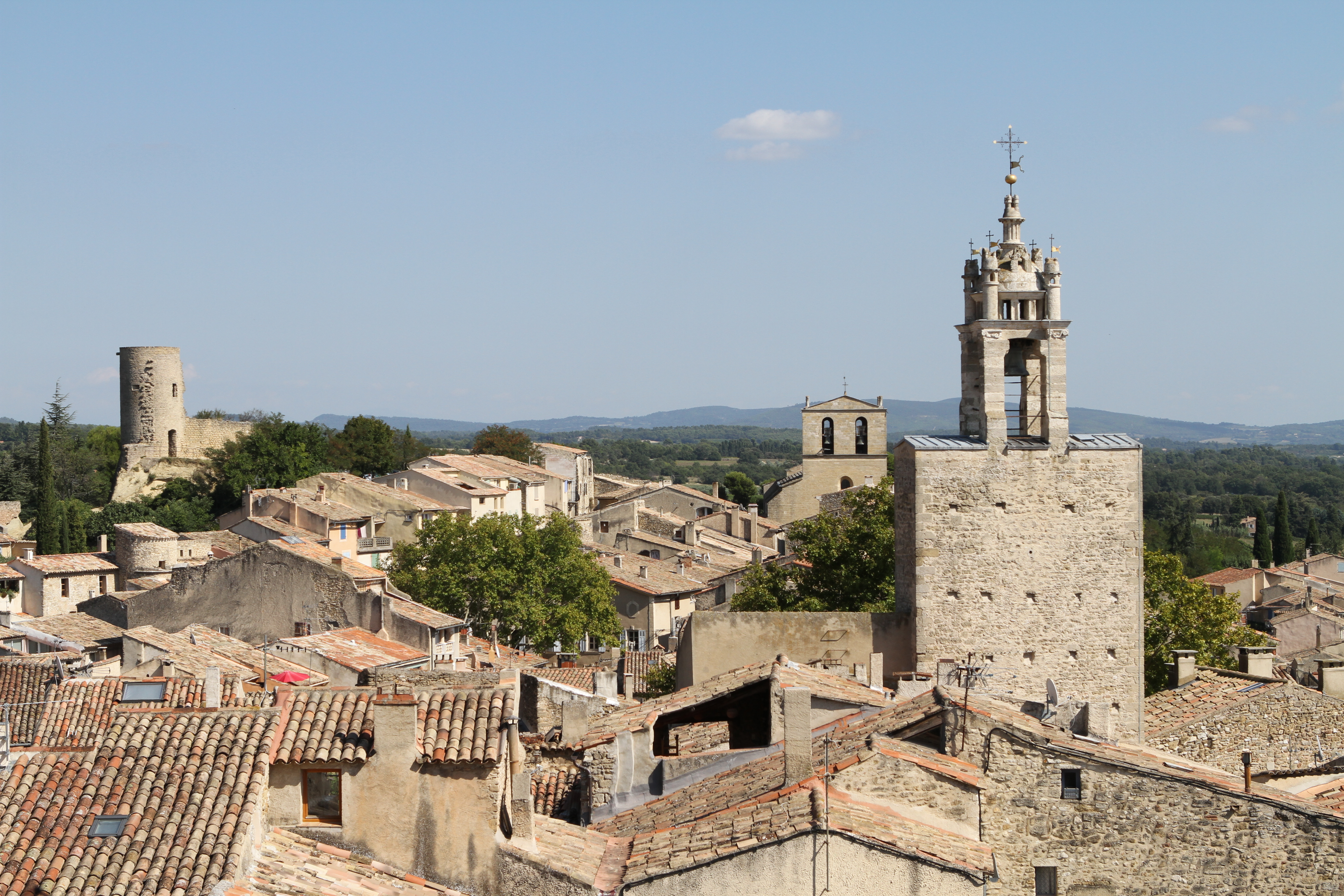
- View of the town of Cucuron

- Coat of arms
- Location of Cucuron
- Location within France Location within Provence-Alpes-Côte d'Azur
- Coordinates: 43°46′27″N 5°26′22″E
- Country: France
- Region: Provence-Alpes-Côte d'Azur
- Department: Vaucluse
- Arrondissement: Apt
- Canton: Cheval-Blanc
- Intercommunality: CC Sud Luberon

Government
  - Mayor (2020–2026): Philippe Egg
- Area^{1}: 32.68 km^{2} (12.62 sq mi)
- Elevation: 375 m (1,230 ft)
- Highest elevation: 1,105 m (3,625 ft)
- Lowest elevation: 235 m (771 ft)
- Population (2023): 1,885
  - Density: 57.68/km^{2} (149.4/sq mi)
- Time zone: UTC+01:00 (CET)
  - Summer (DST): UTC+02:00 (CEST)
- INSEE/Postal code: 84042 /84160
- Website: cucuron.fr
- ^{1} French Land Register data, which excludes lakes, ponds, glaciers > 1 km^{2} (0.386 sq mi or 247 acres) and river estuaries.

Cucuron (French pronunciation: [kykyʁɔ̃]) is a commune in the Vaucluse department, of the Provence-Alpes-Côte d'Azur region, in Southeastern France.

Located on the south side of the Luberon mountain range, Cucuron is surrounded by slopes of grapevines and olive trees. There are several cooperatives in the village, including for wine and olive oil production. The present village dates from earlier than the 11th century and suffered a serious plague epidemic in 1720. Its primary features are a long pond (l'étang) that occupies its main square, the ruins of a medieval keep, and two churches.

Cucuron features in two movies: A Good Year and The Horseman on the Roof (French: Le hussard sur le toit).

== Geography ==
Cucuron is located on the south side of the Luberon mountain range and includes most of the northern slope of the Aigues valley, sloping gently towards the south. The rural district of Cucuron is part of the Luberon Regional Park (Parc naturel régional du Luberon).

The highest point of the village area is located at its northern end, 1,040 m above sea level, on the crest of the Luberon. The village itself is located on a hill dominating the area, consisting of zaffre, with the highest part of the village proper at 375 m. It is surrounded by slopes of grapevines and vegetable crops, cereals (wheat fields) or abandoned agricultural land.

The extreme south of the territory is part of the alluvial plain of the Durance. Several rivers irrigate the village area, this includes the Vabre and Hermitage streams - the latter supplies the village.

Plots of land "in slices" may be legacy areas (villae) of the Gallo-Roman period - two sites have been clearly identified and excavated.

=== Distance from major towns ===
The times given in brackets are estimates which include part of the journey by motorway where relevant.

- Pertuis: 12 km (15 minutes)
- Apt: 26 km (30 minutes)
- Cavaillon: 28 km (45 minutes)
- Aix-en-Provence: 37 km (35 minutes)
- Marseille: 65 km (55 minutes)
- Avignon: 66 km (1 hour)

The villages closest to Cucuron are Ansouis (5 km), Vaugines (2.2 km), Lourmarin (7.4 km) and Cadenet (8 km).

=== Toponymy ===
Local tradition ascribes the origin of the village name to Julius Caesar, like many Provence villages. Caesar, seeing the inhabitants of the place run, was said to have stated the Latin phrase cur currunt? ("Why do they run?"). In fact Cucuron, under various spellings, is a common placename in southern France, meaning a peak, mound. Many localities are so named, as well as various villages: Coucouron (Ardèche), Cuguron (Haute-Garonne), Cuqueron (Pyrénées-Atlantiques).

The village name derives from the pre-indo-European root "Kuk", which means a place located on a high mountain or a round hill. The village has had various names: castro Cucurone and castro Cucuroau in the 11th century, in tertitorio Cucuronis, of Cucurun in the 12th century, Cucuron from the 16th century.

== History ==
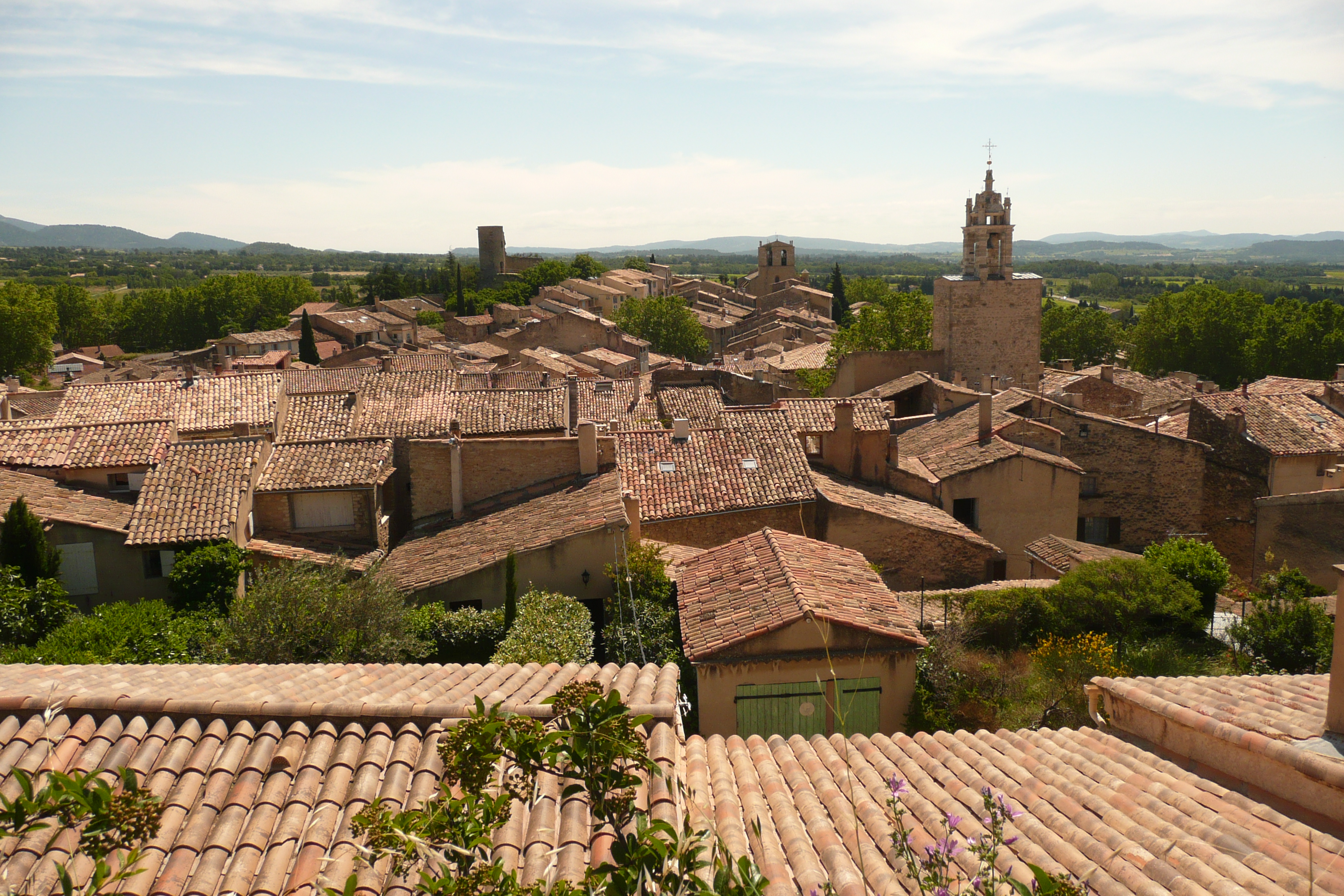
Looking over the village

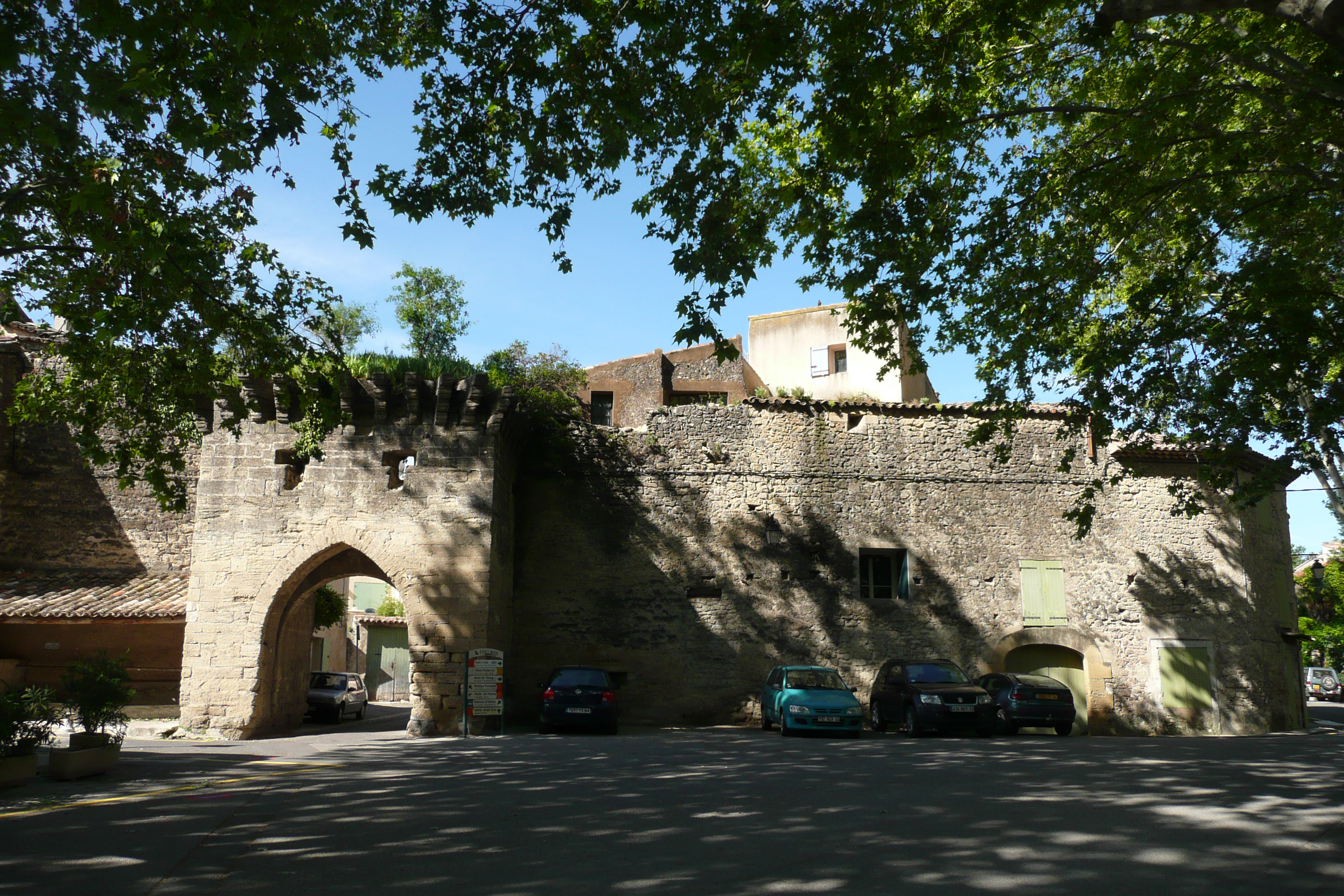
Ramparts

The medieval village site was occupied from the Neolithic period (at a place called Castelas). During protohistory, it was on the territory of the Gauls of Dexcivate, established along the Durance, as indicated by Conch graves.

A site on the plain, to the south of the village, dates from the Gallo-Roman period: villas were established there benefiting from the fertile land, with several burial grounds and a mausoleum - the Pourrières mausoleum, dates from the 1st century BC.

In the Middle Ages, a castrum (castle) was built on the hill by the Reillanne-Valence family: the present village dates from earlier than the 11th century and is quoted for the first time in 1024, under the name of castrum cucurone. The castle passed between the hands of several families of seigneurs (lords): the Sabrans in the 12th century, then the Castillon and the Oraison in co-seigneurship and finally the Bruni from La Tour-d'Aigues at the end of the 18th century. Meanwhile, a "consulate" was created; the village was consequently administered by "consuls" which controlled the local justices and lower courts.

During the late Middle Ages, Cucuron hosted a Jewish community which was officially expelled in 1501. It also accommodated a Vaudois minority, after they repopulated Luberon at the end of the 15th century. In 1534, the archbishop of Aix-en-Provence executed ten of these 'heretics', which included inhabitants of Cucuron. However, at the time of the French Wars of Religion, Cucuron remained predominantly catholic, unlike the surrounding villages.

In 1720-1, the village was hit hard by a plague epidemic which spread from Marseille.

== Coat of arms ==
Arms of Cucuron

The arms are emblazoned with the following:
Gules background with a silver tower that has a door and arrowslits. The tower is flanked by two savages with a symmetrical profile, who hold the tower; the one on the right with their left hand, the one on the left with their right hand, their other hands hold a club.

Cucuron motto: cucurrunt sed vixerunt (they ran but they overcame)

== List of mayors ==
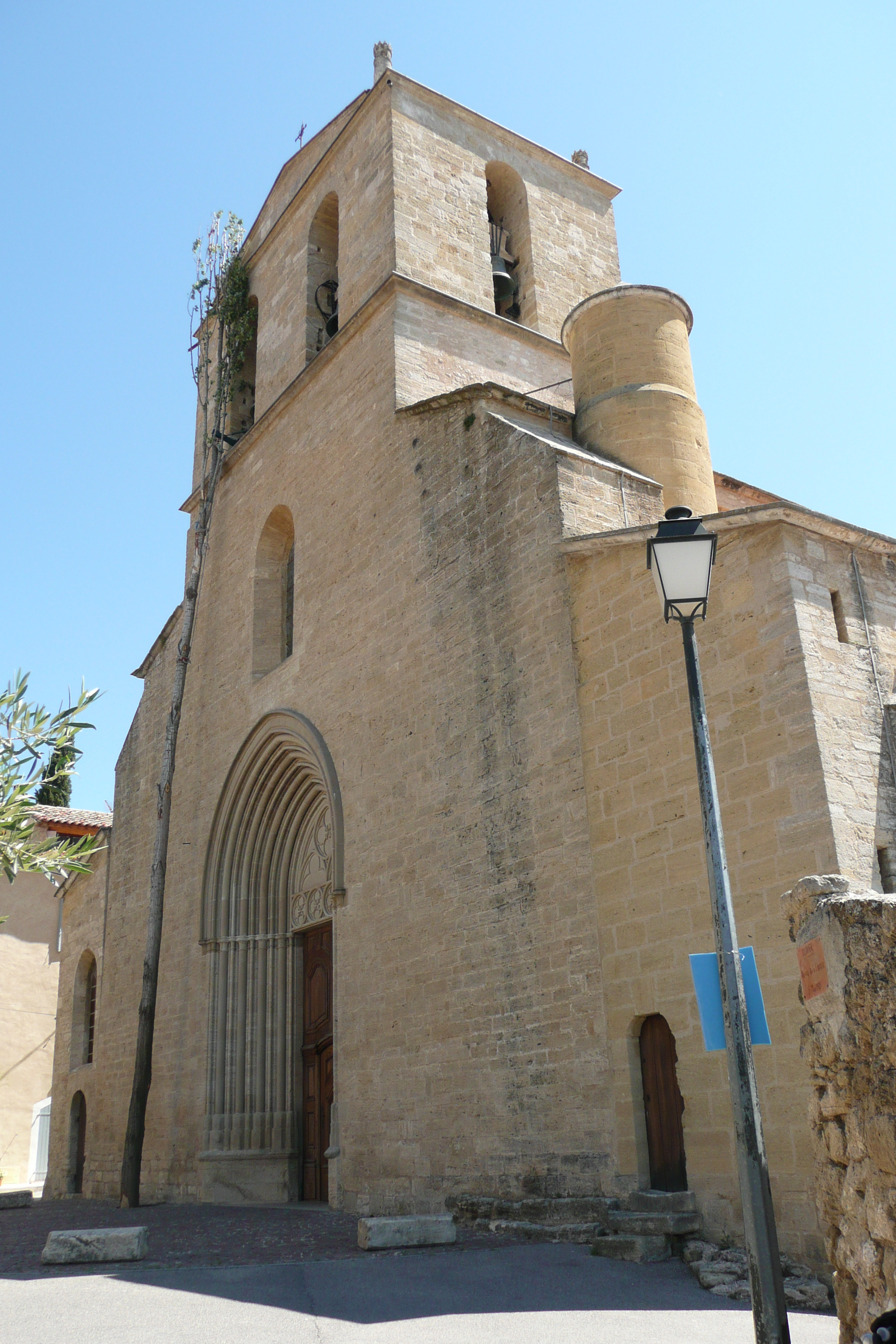
Notre-Dame-de-Beaulieu - the village church

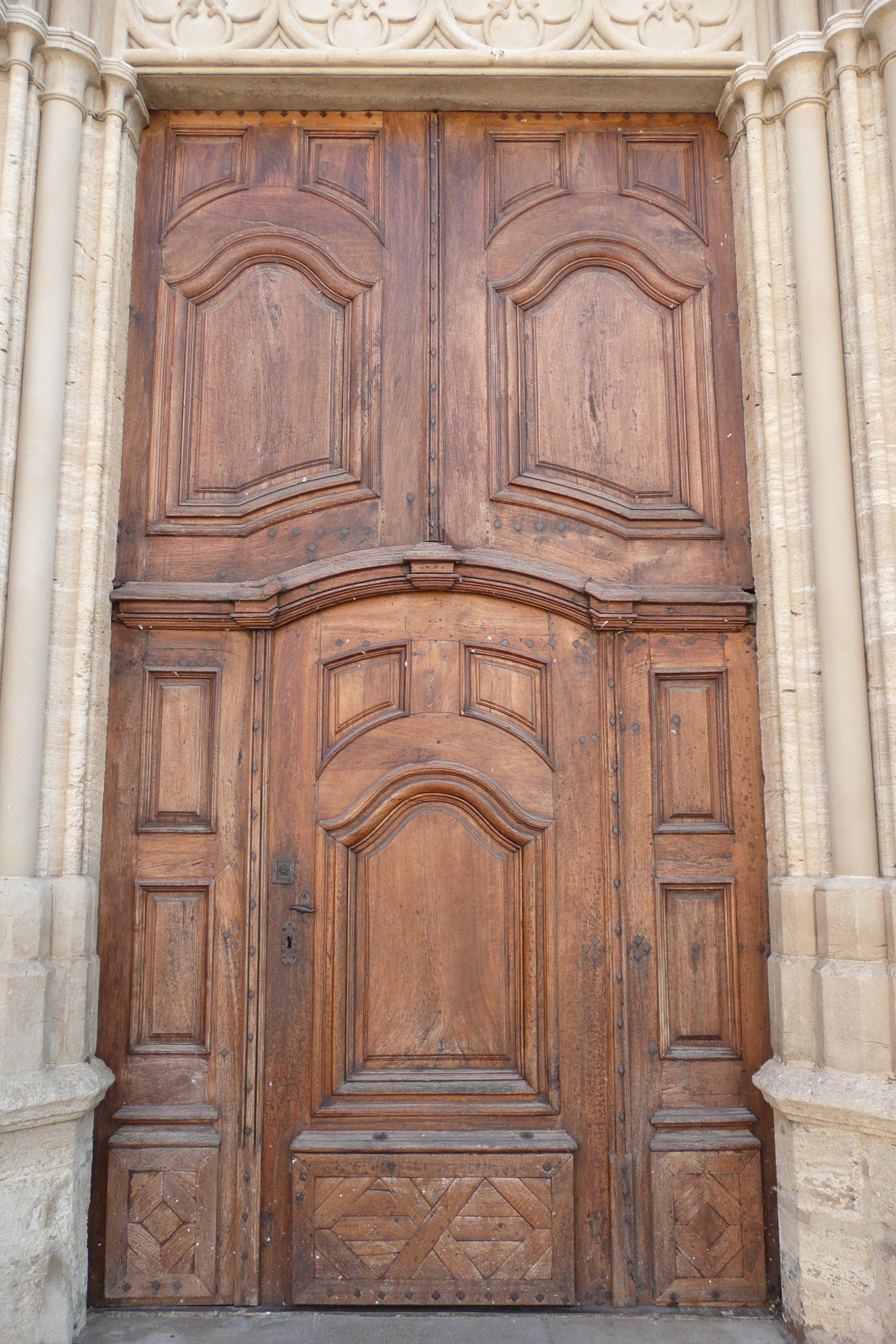
Church door

List of mayors
Term	Name
1995–2001	Alain Gardon
2001–2008	Gérard Livolsi
2008–2020	Roger Deranque
2020–incumbent	Philippe Egg

== Demographics ==
Historical population
Year	Pop.	±% p.a.
1968	1,177	—
1975	1,206	+0.35%
1982	1,409	+2.25%
1990	1,624	+1.79%
1999	1,792	+1.10%
2007	1,816	+0.17%
2012	1,809	−0.08%
2017	1,766	−0.48%
2023	1,885	+1.09%
Source: INSEE

The village had almost 1,000 inhabitants at the beginning of the 14th century and there were nearly 2,000 on the eve of the Great Plague of Marseille of 1720-1. The deaths caused by the plague, however, led to a sharp decline in population in the 18th century, that decline was compounded in the 19th century with rural flight.

The inhabitants of the village are called Cucuronnais in French.

== Economy ==
There are many traders in the village: a grocers, a tobacco shop, two bakeries and a butcher, a pharmacy, restaurants, bars and a hotel. It has had ADSL (broadband internet) since January 2005.

=== Agriculture ===
The viticulture (vineyards) and vegetable crops (asparagus in particular) found on village land, are from post World War I. The village has several cooperatives: one for cherry jam, an agricultural cooperative for wheat and other grains, a viticultural cooperative, and two olive oil mills open their doors to olive growers in mid-November.

The village produces Côtes du Luberon AOC wines - AOC stands for Appellation d'origine contrôlée (controlled designation of origin). Wines which are not AOC can be labelled, after approval, vin de pays d'Aigues.

Like the rest of the surrounding area, olive cultivation is growing in Cucuron.

=== Tourism ===
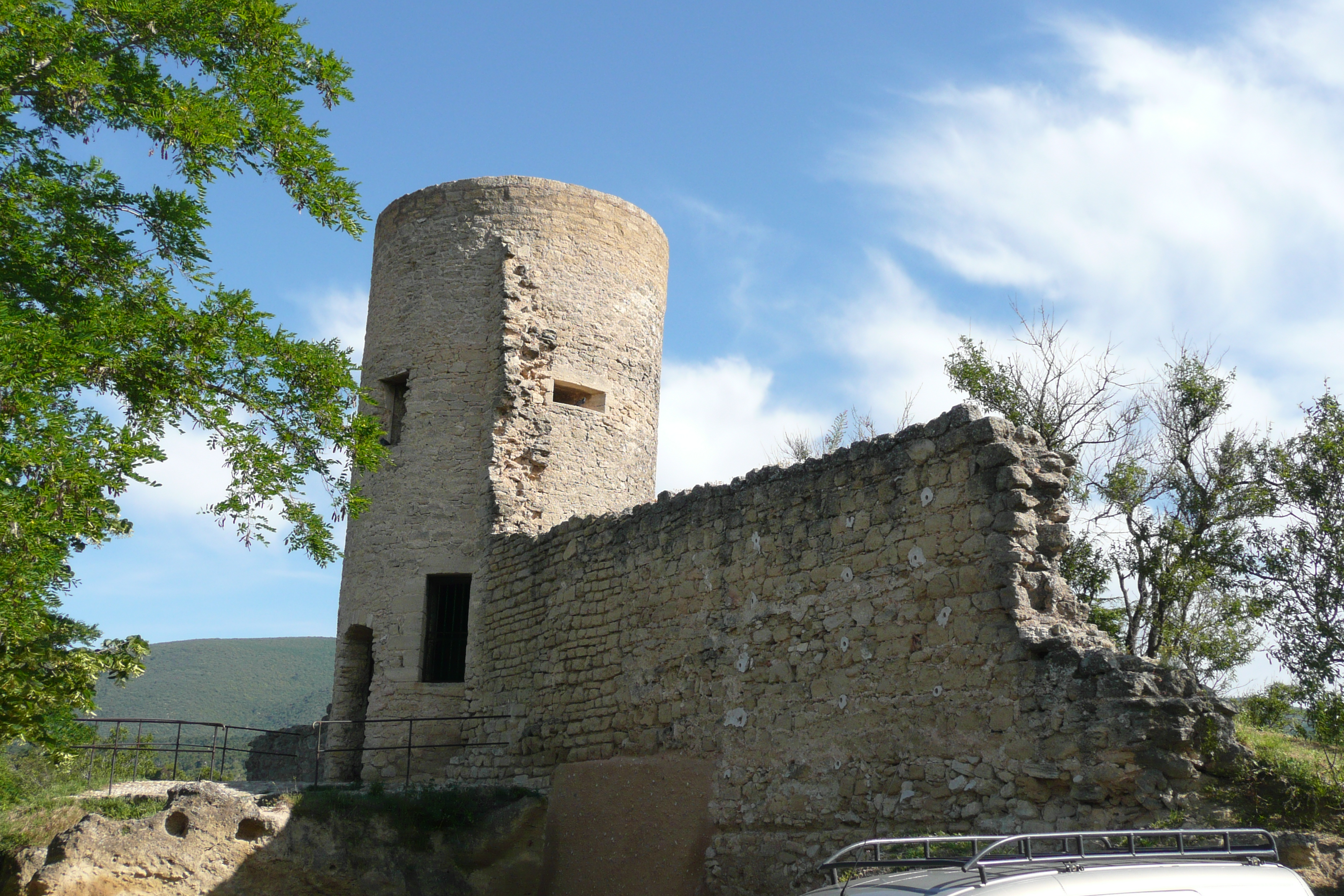
Ruins

As with all municipalities in the Luberon, tourism plays a role, directly or indirectly, in the local economy.

There are three main kinds of tourism in the Luberon. Firstly cultural, which relies on a heritage of village hilltops and festivals. Secondly, relaxation tourism which has resulted in a significant development of chambres d'hôtes (bed and breakfasts), hotels and rental properties; a large concentration of swimming pools and provençale markets. Lastly, walking holidays which benefit from the footpaths and protected countryside of the Luberon and surrounding area.

== Education ==
The village has a public elementary school, the pupils are then sent to Le Luberon, a lower secondary school in Cadenet, then Val de Durance lycée (upper secondary school) in Pertuis (mainstream education) or Alexandre Dumas collège in Cavaillon or Alphonse Benoit college in L'Isle-sur-la-Sorgue (technical education).

== Local life ==
A market is held on Tuesdays and two major holidays punctuate the life of the village:

- the votive festival takes place at the beginning of July.
- the Feast of Saint Tulle is held on the first Saturday after May 21: the l'arbre de mai “tree of May” - a poplar is transported by men through the village and tied-up the front side of the church. This commemorates the occasion of the 'intervention of the saint' to put an end to the plague of 1720.

Four night markets are held each year between the months of July and August, around l'étang (the pond), generally the last two Fridays of July and the first two of August. Local craftsmen and producers attend these markets.

Scenes from the films The Horseman on the Roof and A Good Year were filmed in the village.

== Places of interest ==
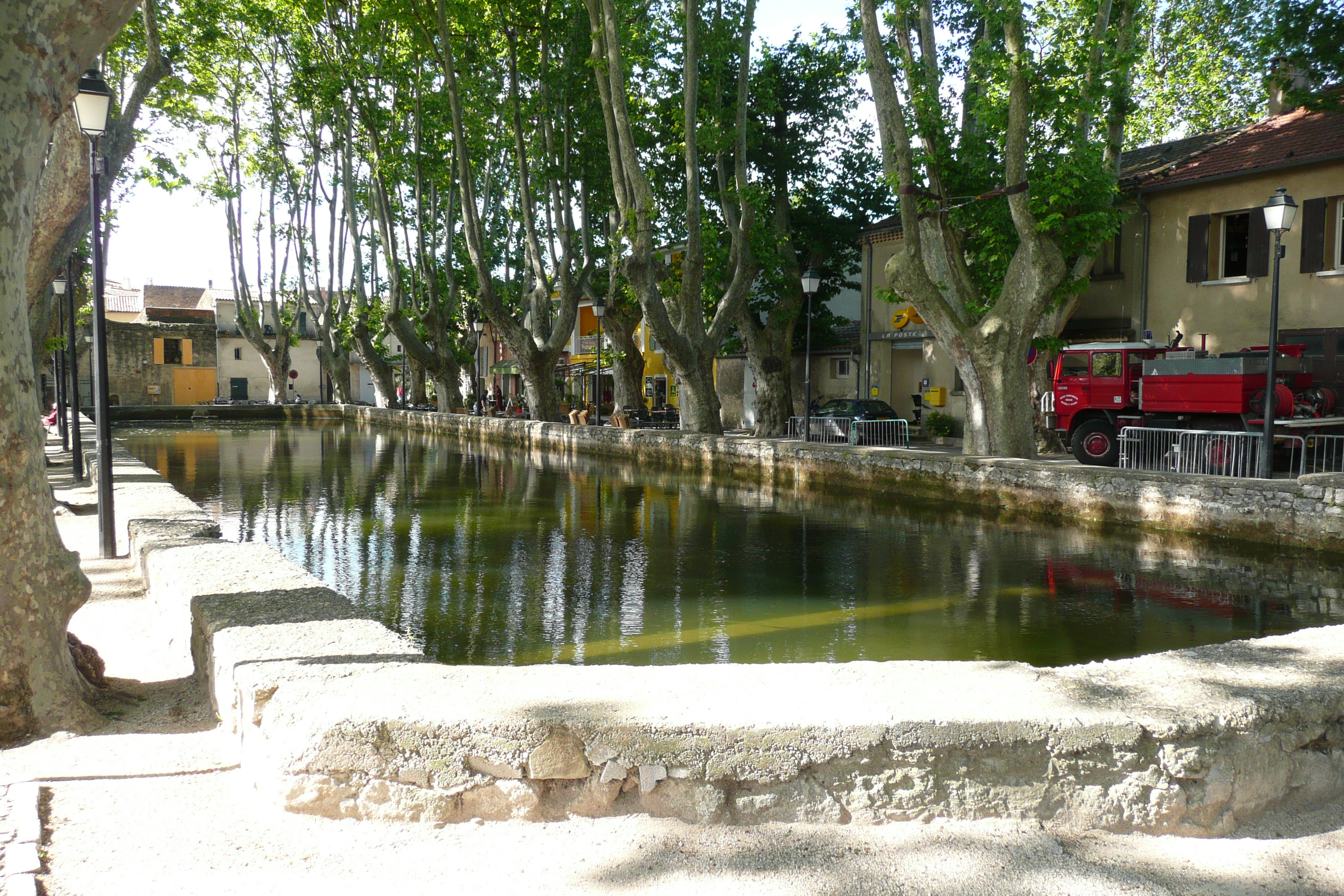
L'étang - a large basin of water in the main square of the village

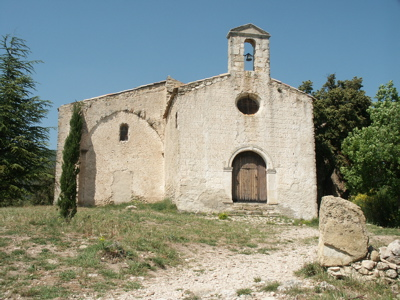
Notre-Dame-de-Beauvoir chapel

- Bassin de l'étang - a large quadrangular basin of water that dates from the beginning of the 14th century, located at the north of the village: it previously supplied a mill in the village.
- Notre-Dame-de-Beaulieu church - partly in Romance style of Provence (13th century), partly in Gothic style.
- Notre-Dame-de-Beauvoir chapel (early Romanesque), otherwise known as the Hermitage. Initially a small pilgrimage shrine, annex of the parish, quoted in several wills since 1292. All that remains of the Roman chapel is an arch-shaped vault. The last bay was later transformed into a dwelling. At the beginning of the 17th century, it was maintained by a confraternity who built a bell tower in 1602, a hermitage in 1613 and a new nave between 1614 and 1620. The chapel became communal property after the French Revolution and was restored in 1957, then again in the middle of the 1970s.
- Medieval walls, with gates and towers, including the belfry, or “Clock tower” - 13th-16th centuries. Three successive walls surrounded the city during the Middle Ages.
- Ruins of the castle and cellars dug into the zaffre - remains of a quadrangular tower of the 14th century, called “Saint-Michel tower”.
- 16th century olive oil mill, in a cave dug under the ramparts in the south of the village.
- Viticultural cooperative wine shop
- Municipal library
- Marc Deydier Museum, named after a cucuronnais scholar - includes archaeological collections of Gallo-Roman and Neolithic excavations, local ethnography and history of the village.
- The garden of Pavillon de Galon, which was awarded the "Remarkable Garden" label by the French Ministry of Culture & Environment in 2010.
- A cinema named Cigalon which has approximately 100 seats; it shows French and foreign films.

== Popular expression ==
In the parlance of southern France, the term Cucuron-les-Olivettes means a remote place, devoid of interest or place that does not exist.

== Notable people related to the village ==
- Jean Joseph Marius Diouloufet (1771–1840), a Provence poet, died in Cucuron.
