= Tiane Doan Na Champassak =

French artist (born 1973)

Tiane Doan na Champassak
- Born: August 19, 1973 (age 52); Puyvert, France
- Known for: Contemporary Art, Artists' books
- Website: champassak.com

Tiane Doan na Champassak (born August 19, 1973) is a French artist of Asian descent best known for his photo-based works and artists' books.

After a prolific collaboration as a photographer with Agence Vu during which he was awarded a World Press Photo, a Prix Roger Pic, and grants from the Jean-Luc Lagardère Foundation and Villa Medici, Doan na Champassak shifted his attention to photography as a contemporary art form. The main focus of his work is exploring various aspects of sexuality, such as ambiguity and censorship, by processing, reusing and juxtaposing materials from multiple sources.

In the last 15 years, he published a large number of artists' books that have become part of important private and public collections such as The Getty Research Institute, The International Center of Photography, Centre Pompidou, Maison Européenne de la Photographie, and Tate Modern.

== Publications ==
- Parkett, RVB Books, 2024
- The Veil of Maya 6, Siam's Guy Books, 2024
- The King is dead, long live the King, bruno, 2023
- Voyage au centre de la Terre, the(M)éditions, 2023
- The Veil of Maya 5, Siam’s Guy Books, 2023
- Indo-Chine, Humboldt Books, 2022
- Paris Hollywood, RVB Books, 2022
- Copy That, Edition Honoré Visconti, 2022
- The Veil of Maya 4, Siam's Guy Books, 2022
- Via Pia, Siam’s Guy Books, 2021
- Making Of / Taking Off, Siam’s Guy Books, 2020
- The Veil of Maya 3, Siam’s Guy Books, 2020
- City, Siam’s Guy Books, 2019
- The Veil of Maya 2, Siam’s Guy Books, 2019
- The Veil of Maya 1, Siam’s Guy Books, 2018
- Scraps, RVB Books, 2018
- Strokes, Siam’s Guy Books, 2018
- All the Posters Fit to Print, Siam’s Guy Books, 2018
- Censored, RVB Books, 2017
- 3AM by AM Projects, Akina, 2017
- The Strip, Siam’s Guy Books, 2017
- 41.667, Siam’s Guy Books, 2016
- Tamarind Ghosts, Editions du Lic, 2016
- Hardcore, Siam’s Guy Books, 2016
- Palms, Siam’s Guy Books, 2016
- Siam’s Guy, RVB Books, 2016
- My Freedom, Siam’s Guy Books, 2016
- No Photos, Siam’s Guy Books, 2015
- Ovr Sxe Dsir, Siam’s Guy Books, 2015
- Abstracts by AM Projects, ADAD Books, 2015
- Sunless, Editions du Lic, 2015
- Sale, RVB Books, 2014
- Kolkata, Editions Bessard, 2014
- Dick999, RVB Books, 2014
- Looters, Siam’s Guy Books, 2014
- Credo, Siam’s Guy Books, 2013
- Spleen and Ideal, Mörel Books, 2012
- Nocturnes by AM Projects, Dienacht Publishing, 2012
- The Father of Pop Dance, Siam’s Guy Books, 2012
- Tantra, Siam’s Guy Books, 2012
- Looters, Siam’s Guy Books, 2011
- The King of Photography, Siam’s Guy Books, 2011
- No Photo, Bellybandbooks, 2011
- Le Sexe des Anges, Éditions de la Martinière, 2003

== Films ==
- Natpwe, the feast of the spirits, Tiane Doan Na Champassak and Jean Dubrel, 2012 – Winner of the 2012 Scribe Prize for Cinema and Best Short Documentary CIDFF 2013. Official selection TIFF 2013, NYFF 2013, Festcurtas Belo Horizonte 2013, DOCLISBOA 2013 and IDFA 2013.

== Exhibitions ==
- Paris Hollywood, RVB Books Gallery, Paris, 2023
- Folded Cities, Studio 454, Venice, 2023
- Give Me Some News, Mouvements-rueVisconti, Paris, 2022
- Burning Matter, Studio 454, Venice, October 2020
- Censored, Fflag, Turin, October 2020
- The Hoodie, Het Nieuwe Instituut, Rotterdam, November 2019
- Sunless and Corpus, Résidence 1+2 Toulouse, November 2018
- Corpus, ISelf Collection: Bumped Bodies, Whitechapel Gallery, London, April 2018
- Spleen and Ideal, Eyes Wild Open, Museum of Botanique, Bruxelles, February 2018
- Censored, Polka Gallery, Paris Photo, November 2016
- Public, Private, Secret (Looters), ICP Museum, New York, USA, June 2016
- Siam’s Guy, RVB Books Gallery, Paris, France, June 2016
- Sunless, Silencio, Paris, France, April 2016
- Looters – Strange and Familiar: Britain as Revealed by International Photographers, Barbican, London, March 2016
- Abstracts – AM Projects, Galerie Honoré, Paris, France, October 2015
- Sunless, Polka Gallery, Paris, France, September 2015
- Abstracts – AM Projects, Copperfield Gallery, London, UK, May 2015
- Looters, Format International Photography Festival, Derby, UK, March 2015
- Fieret + Tiane, Kahmann Gallery, Amsterdam, the Netherlands, December 2014
- Dick999, East Wing Gallery, Paris Photo, France, November 2014
- Looters, Galerie Les Yeux Ouverts, Fontainebleau, October 2014
- Sunless, Kahmann Gallery, PAN Amsterdam, the Netherlands, November 2013
- Sunless, Kahmann Gallery, Unseen Photo Fair Amsterdam, the Netherlands, September 2013
- Looters, East Wing Gallery, Unseen Photo Fair Amsterdam, the Netherlands, September 2013
- Showroom – Spleen and Ideal, The Copper House Gallery, Dublin, Ireland, June 2013
- Looters, LWS Gallery, Paris, France, May 2013
- Spleen and Ideal, East Wing Gallery, Paris Photo, November 2012
- Spleen and Ideal, East Wing Gallery, Unseen Photo Fair Amsterdam, the Netherlands, September 2012
- Between the Lines, Croxhapox, Ghent, Belgium, May 2012
- Crossing Lalibela, Dumbarton Oaks Museum, Washington, DC June – October 2011
- Kolkata, Metropolis 2.0, The Empty Quarter Gallery, Dubai, UAE, October 2011
- Kolkata, Noorderlicht Photofestival 2011, The Netherlands, September 2011
- Corpus, Kahmann Gallery, Amsterdam, Netherlands, June 2009
- Eunuchs, Angkor Photography Festival, Cambodia, November 2007
- Credo - India, Noorderlicht Photofestival 2007, The Netherlands, September 2007
- Un/Mill à 2.8, Maison Européenne de la Photographie, Paris, November 2006
- Ecstasy Images’04, Vevey, Switzerland, September 2004
- Perspectives on Ten New European Capitals, Avenue des Champs-Elysées, Paris, May 2004
