= Louis Serre (politician) =

French industrialist and politician (1873–1939)

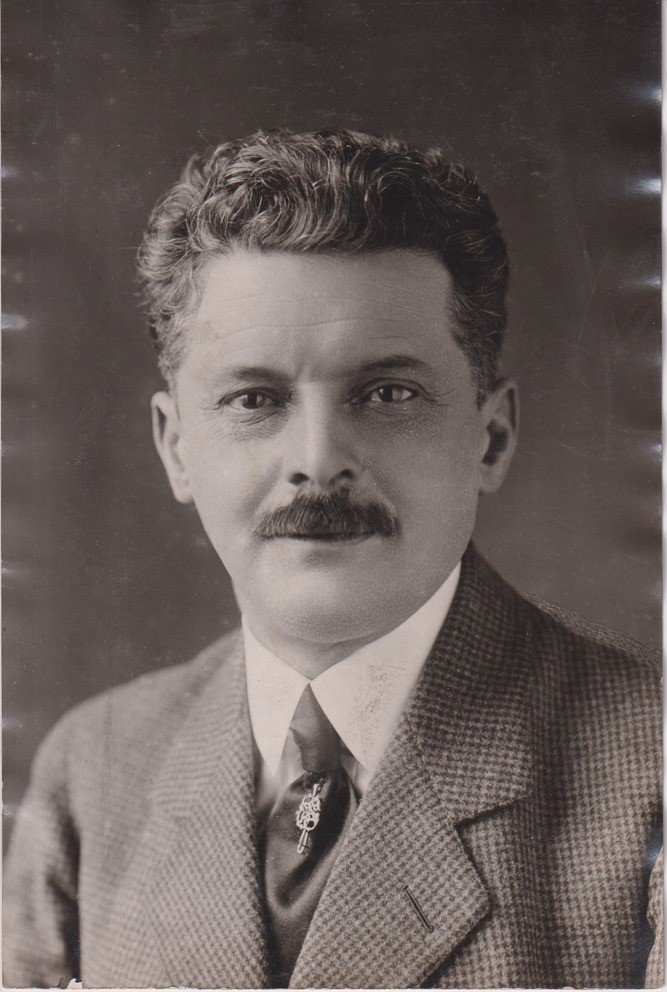
- Born: 17 August 1873; Lagnes
- Died: 8 January 1939 (aged 65); Avignon
- Education: college of Carpentras
- Occupations: industrialist and politician
- Years active: 1914–1933
- Known for: MP, Senator, Minister of Trade

Louis Serre (French pronunciation: [lwi sɛʁ]; 17 August 1873 – 8 January 1939) was a French industrialist and politician.

== Biography ==
Louis Serre was born 17 August 1873 in Lagnes. He was educated at the college of Carpentras and was on the faculty of the Paris Law Faculty. He was MP for Vaucluse 1914 to 1919 under the Parti républicain, radical et radical-socialiste (RRRS) and Senator of Vaucluse from 1920 to 1936 under the Gauche démocratique (GD). He was Minister of Trade and Industry from 31 January to 26 October 1933 under the government of Édouard Daladier. He died 8 January 1939 in Avignon.
