= Jacques Rouchouse =

French radio producer and music critic (1946–2024)

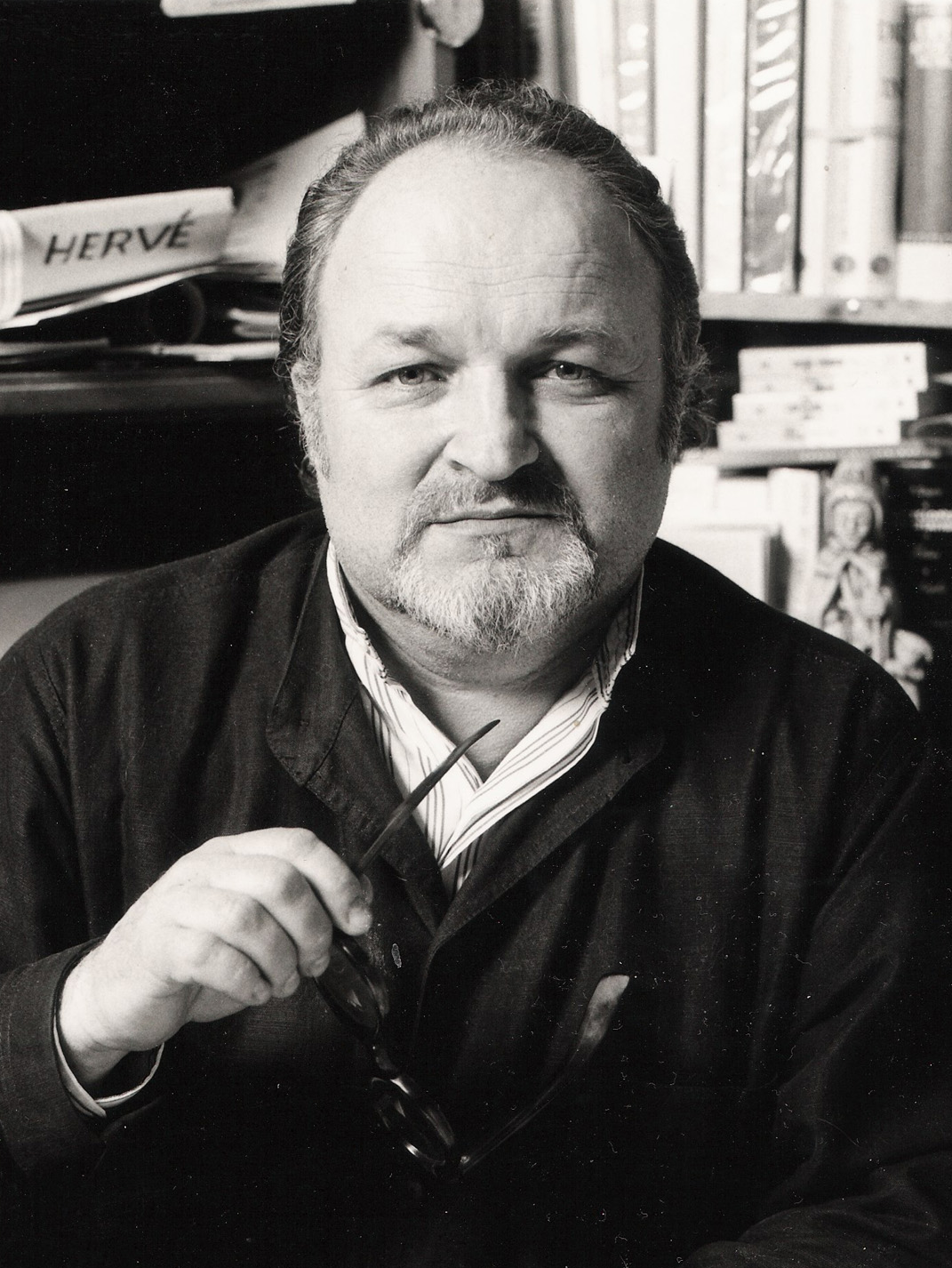
- Rouchouse in 1994
- Born: Jacques Albert Rouchouse; 13 April 1946; 4th arrondissement of Lyon, France
- Died: 4 September 2024 (aged 78); Lauris, France
- Occupations: Radio producer Music critic

Jacques Albert Rouchouse (13 April 1946 – 4 September 2024) was a French radio producer, music critic, and writer. He produced numerous musical radio shows and was one of the largest operetta promoters in France.

== Biography ==
Born in the 4th arrondissement of Lyon on 13 April 1946, Rouchouse developed a fascination for music at a young age while listening to radio shows hosted by the likes of Pierre Hiegel. He attended his first stage production on 7 February 1960, an opéra comique titled La fille du tambour-major and first written by Jacques Offenbach. In 1973, he moved to Paris and was hired to host the radio show Dialogues de France-Culture on the Office de Radiodiffusion Télévision Française, which ran from 1973 to 1984. In 1979, he proposed a project for lyrical broadcasts on France Culture alongside Yves Jaigu, which culminated in the production of L’opérette c’est la fête, which ran from 1981 to 1988. He also collaborated on the show Le Grand Débat alongside Jacques Julliard, which covered operettas. Julliard spoke of Rouchouse's "vocation" for the theatre form.

In 1999, Rouchouse was hired by the Presses Universitaires de France to cover operettas. He created a monography on the composer Hervé, which was described as a "chronicle of French society and especially of the Parisian artistic milieu". According to Le Monde, the work had a great impact "by plunging into this parallel world - this half-world which fascinated the great - it is almost a civilization that one discovers". As a member of the Académie de Vaucluse, he stayed in Lauris following his retirement. This was chosen because it was the childhood home of Joseph-François Garnier, on whom he wrote a biography.

Rouchouse died in Lauris on 4 September 2024, at the age of 78.

== Publications ==
=== Books ===
- Hervé, le père de l’opérette - 50 ans de Folies Parisiennes (1994)
- L’Opérette (1999)
- Le Mystère des Garnier, ou l'aventure extraordinaire de trois provençaux, hautboïstes à l'Opéra de Paris, à la fin du XVIIIe siècle (2003)

=== Prefaces ===
- La gloire de l'Opérette 1922-1937 (2000)
- À la recherche du chant perdu : l'âge d'or de la R.T.L.N (2013)

=== Record productions ===
- l’Opérette, c’est la Fête (1986)
- l’Opérette en Folie (1999)

== Radio productions ==
=== For France Culture ===
- Opéra, opérettes, ou quand les chanteurs d'opéra rendent hommage à l'opérette (1979)
- Dix heures pour Offenbach (1980)
- L’Opérette, c’est la fête (1981–1988)
- Le tour de France de l'opérette (1986–1988)
- Hommage à Dranem (1986)
- Les groupies de l’opérette (1985–1986)
- Airs à boire et à manger (1985–1986)

=== Other radio stations ===
- "Les nuits de France Musique : Les nuits Offenbach" – "Opérette, où as-tu la tête ?" (France Musique, 1987)
- "Histoires d’O...pérettes" (Radio France, 1988)
- "L’Opérette bat la campagne" (Local radios affiliated with Radio France, 1990)
- "L’Opérette, c’est la fête" (France Inter, 1995–1996)
- "L’été Offenbach" (France Inter, 1997)
- "De l’Opérette à l’Opéra" (Radio Bleue, 1997–1999)
- "L’été Viennois" (1998)
- Les rendez-vous de l’Opérette (1999)
- La note lyrique (1999–2000)

== Awards ==
- Member of the Société des gens de lettres
- Member of the Société civile des auteurs multimédia
- Medal of Honour of Pierre-Bénite (1987)
- Medal of Honour of Lauris (1993)
- Prix Thyde Monnier of the Société des gens de lettres (1994)
- Grand Prix de Littérature Musicale of the Académie Charles-Cros (1995)
- Member of the Académie de Vaucluse (2007)
