= Canton of Cheval-Blanc =

Coordinates: 43.80°N 5.07°E

- Canton
- Situation of the canton of Cheval-Blanc in the department of Vaucluse
- Country: France
- Region: Provence-Alpes-Côte d'Azur
- Department: Vaucluse
- No. of communes: {{{nbcomm}}}
- Population (2023): 32,345
- INSEE code: 8408

The canton of Cheval-Blanc is an administrative division of the Vaucluse department, in southeastern France. It was created at the French canton reorganisation which came into effect in March 2015. Its seat is in Cheval-Blanc.

It consists of the following communes:

1. Cabrières-d'Avignon
2. Cadenet
3. Cheval-Blanc
4. Cucuron
5. Lagnes
6. Lauris
7. Lourmarin
8. Maubec
9. Mérindol
10. Puget
11. Puyvert
12. Robion
13. Taillades
14. Vaugines
