= Cheval-Blanc, Vaucluse =

Cheval-Blanc
- Commune
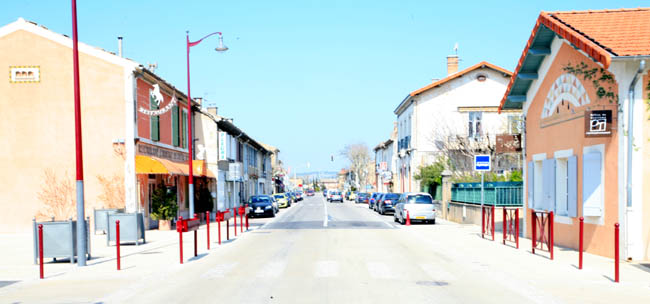
- The main road in the village of Cheval-Blanc

- Coat of arms
- Location of Cheval-Blanc
- Location within France Location within Provence-Alpes-Côte d'Azur
- Coordinates: 43°48′06″N 5°03′50″E
- Country: France
- Region: Provence-Alpes-Côte d'Azur
- Department: Vaucluse
- Arrondissement: Apt
- Canton: Cheval-Blanc
- Intercommunality: CA Luberon Monts de Vaucluse

Government
  - Mayor (2020–2026): Christian Mounier
- Area^{1}: 58.56 km^{2} (22.61 sq mi)
- Elevation: 81 m (266 ft)
- Highest elevation: 725 m (2,379 ft)
- Lowest elevation: 76 m (249 ft)
- Population (2023): 4,362
  - Density: 74.49/km^{2} (192.9/sq mi)
- Time zone: UTC+01:00 (CET)
  - Summer (DST): UTC+02:00 (CEST)
- INSEE/Postal code: 84038 /84460
- ^{1} French Land Register data, which excludes lakes, ponds, glaciers > 1 km^{2} (0.386 sq mi or 247 acres) and river estuaries.

Cheval-Blanc (French pronunciation: [ʃəval blɑ̃]; Occitan: Lo Chivau Blanc) is a commune in the Vaucluse department in the Provence-Alpes-Côte d'Azur region in southeastern France. It is the seat of the Canton of Cheval-Blanc.

== Population ==
Historical population
Year	Pop.	±% p.a.
1968	1,880	—
1975	2,029	+1.10%
1982	2,372	+2.26%
1990	3,032	+3.12%
1999	3,524	+1.68%
2007	4,048	+1.75%
2012	4,080	+0.16%
2017	4,276	+0.94%
2023	4,362	+0.33%
Source: INSEE

== See also ==
- Côtes du Luberon AOC
- Communes of the Vaucluse department
- Luberon
