= Mérindol massacre =

1545 massacre of Protestants ordered by Francis I of France

Coordinates: 43.7567°N 5.2039°E

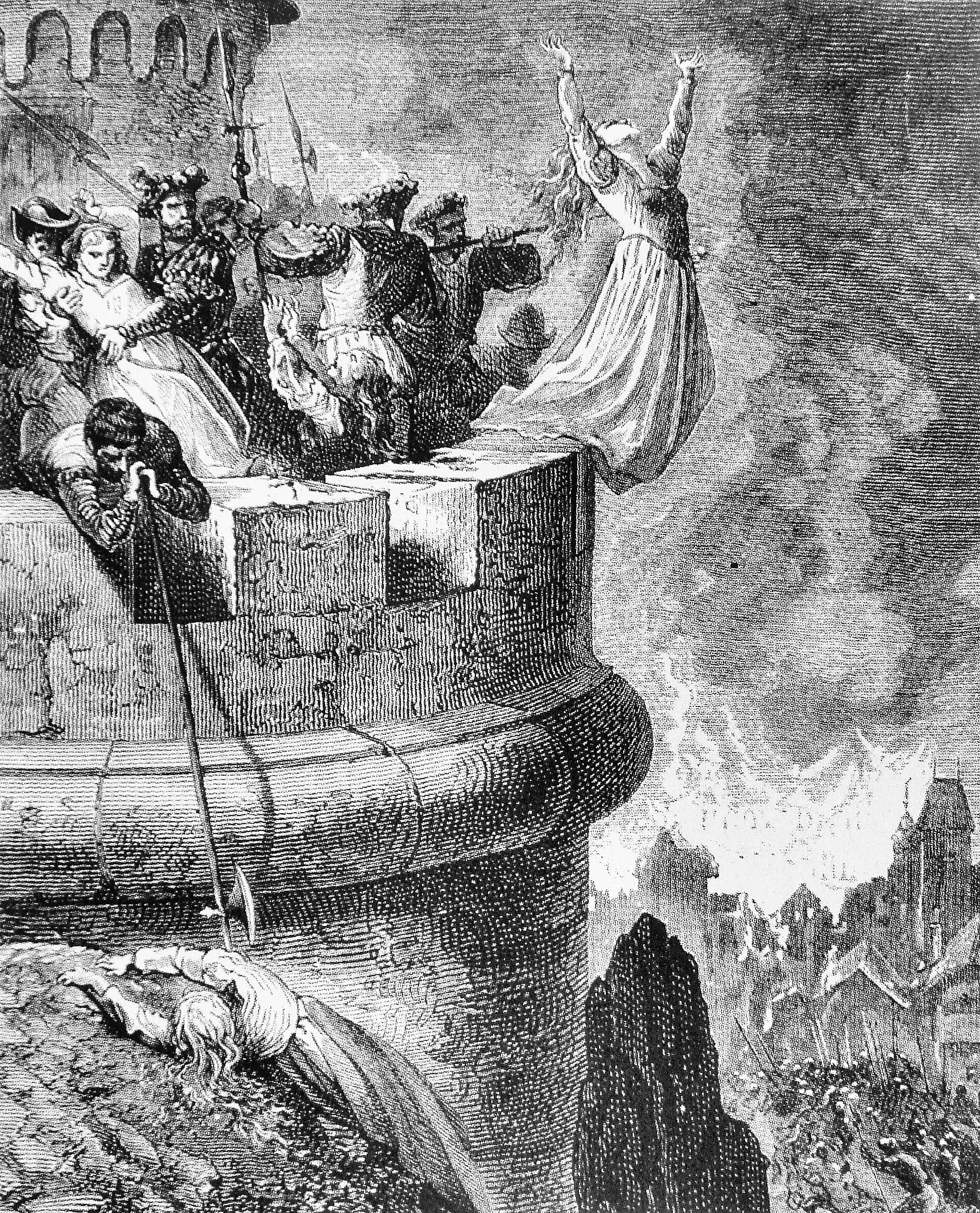
Massacre of the Waldensians of Mérindol in 1545 as imagined by Gustave Doré (1832-1883).

The Mérindol massacre took place in 1545, when Francis I of France ordered that the Vaudois (Waldensians) of the village of Mérindol be punished for heresy. Provençal and papal soldiers killed hundreds or even thousands of Waldensian villagers.

== Arrêt de Mérindol ==
Outside the Piedmont of Italy, the Waldensians joined the local Protestant churches in Bohemia, France and Germany. They had regrouped in the Luberon (Provence) and followed their religions in a carefully concealed manner. As Lutherans started to penetrate their region, the Vaudois (Waldensians') activities came under scrutiny by the French government. The Vaudois became more militant, constructing fortified areas, as in Cabrières, or allegedly attacking an abbey.

The Parlement of Aix-en-Provence issued warrants for arrests and the destruction of villages, the "Arrêt de Mérindol", on 18 November 1541, but never acted on it, pending the villagers' abjuring from heresy. This was finally authorized in 1545 by Francis I after a series of appeals in defense of the Vaudois, notably by Cardinal Jacopo Sadoleto, bishop of Carpentras (Provence), eventually failed.

== The massacres ==
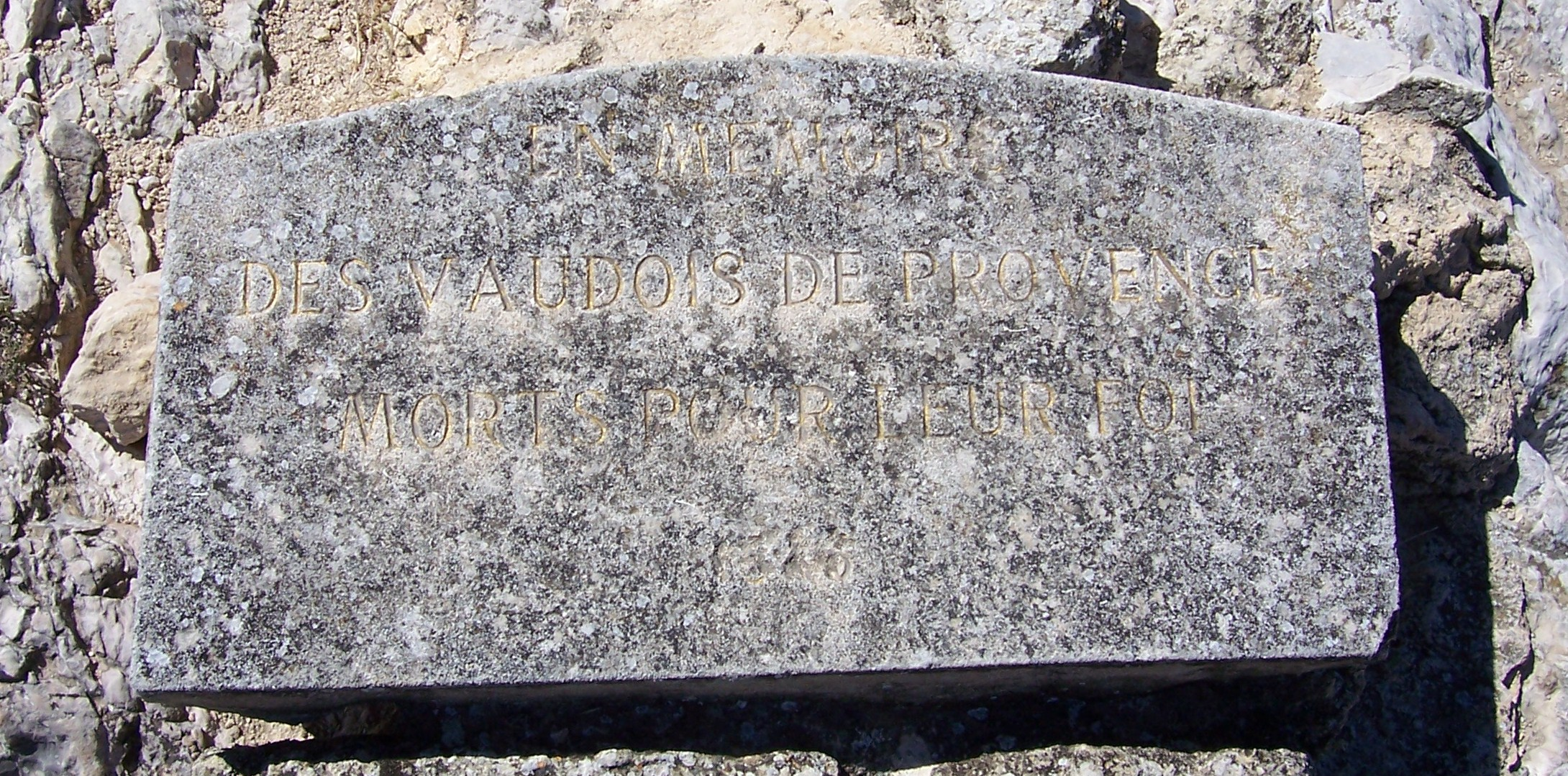
Mérindol plaque "In memory of the Vaudois who died for their faith".

The leaders in the 1545 massacres were Jean Maynier d'Oppède, the new First President of the parlement of Provence, and Antoine Escalin des Aimars, who was returning from the Italian Wars with 2,000 veterans, the Bandes de Piémont. Escalin was on his way to fight against the English in the area of Boulogne after returning from an embassy to Constantinople, where he was French Ambassador to the Ottoman Empire. While in Marseilles in 1545, he was requested to assist Jean Maynier d'Oppède in the repression. In April, Maynier raised an army of Provençal troops mainly from Comtat Venaissin, who were joined by Escalin's forces against the Waldensians of Mérindol and Cabrières.

These soldiers took the villages of Mérindol and Cabrières and also devastated neighbouring Vaudois villages. Historians have estimated that the soldiers killed hundreds to thousands of people. They captured survivors and sent hundreds of men to forced labour in the French galleys. In total, they destroyed between 22 and 28 villages. The execution of one young man, a servant, might well have been the first example of execution by firing squad in Europe for causes of ideology.

In the aftermath, Pope Paul III approved of the actions taken; the Pope rewarded Maynier with Imperial honours.

When French King Henry II took the French throne, however, he promised to investigate the affair. From 1551 the Parliament of Paris tried the judges or leaders of the Aix-en-Provence parlement at length, and the Aix Prosecutor for the King, Guillaume Guérin, was executed in 1553 for falsifying documents.

The massacres probably influenced the Waldensians to become more attached to the Calvinist churches and set the scene for the violent French Wars of Religion (1562 to 1598).
