= Éguilles =

Commune in Provence-Alpes-Côte d'Azur, France

- Commune
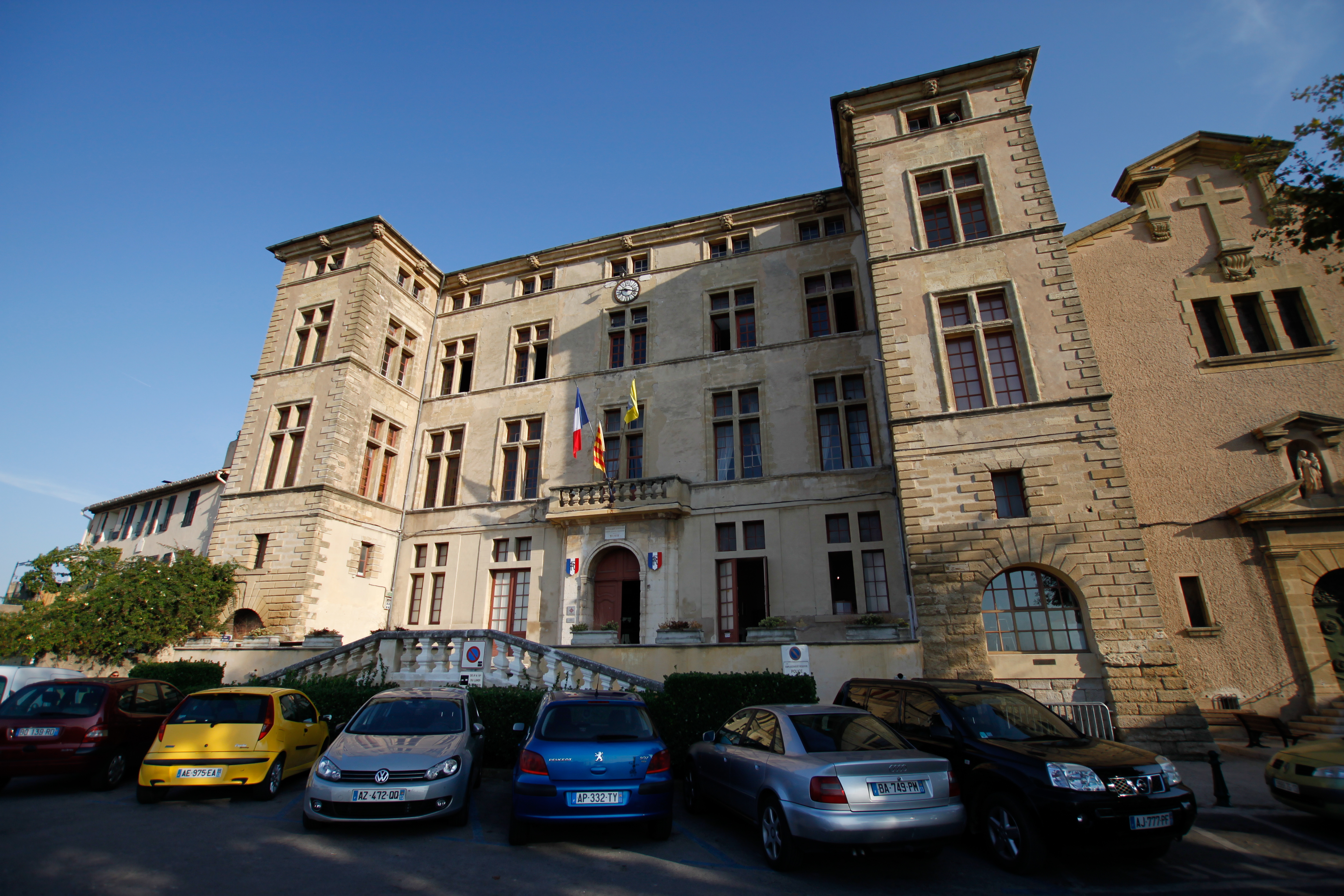
- Town hall of Éguilles

- Coat of arms
- Location of Éguilles
- Location within France Location within Provence-Alpes-Côte d'Azur
- Coordinates: 43°34′10″N 5°21′17″E
- Country: France
- Region: Provence-Alpes-Côte d'Azur
- Department: Bouches-du-Rhône
- Arrondissement: Aix-en-Provence
- Canton: Pélissanne
- Intercommunality: Aix-Marseille-Provence

Government
  - Mayor (2026–32): Renaud Dagorne
- Area^{1}: 34.07 km^{2} (13.15 sq mi)
- Elevation: 250 m (820 ft)
- Highest elevation: 315 m (1,033 ft)
- Lowest elevation: 140 m (460 ft)
- Population (2023): 8,479
  - Density: 248.9/km^{2} (644.6/sq mi)
- Time zone: UTC+01:00 (CET)
  - Summer (DST): UTC+02:00 (CEST)
- INSEE/Postal code: 13032 /13510
- ^{1} French Land Register data, which excludes lakes, ponds, glaciers > 1 km^{2} (0.386 sq mi or 247 acres) and river estuaries.

Éguilles (French pronunciation: [eɡɥij]; Occitan: Agulha [aˈɣyʎɔ, aˈɡyjɔ]) is a commune in the Bouches-du-Rhône department in southern France. It is halfway between Saint-Cannat and Aix-en-Provence.

== History ==
Tracks of an early settlement dating back to the 3rd century BC have been found. However, it appears that in 124BC those tracks were destroyed.

In the 16th century, there were attacks from Aix-en-Provence and Les Baux-de-Provence, and the Castle was destroyed. In 1790 there were 180 inhabitants, mostly shepherds.

In the 19th century many inhabitants left owing to the Industrial Revolution. By 1936 there were only 730 inhabitants.

== Population ==
Historical population

Year	Pop.	±% p.a.
1793	2,561	—
1800	2,500	−0.34%
1806	2,594	+0.62%
1821	2,442	−0.40%
1831	2,280	−0.68%
1836	2,168	−1.00%
1841	1,970	−1.90%
1846	1,885	−0.88%
1851	1,766	−1.30%
1856	1,758	−0.09%
1861	1,780	+0.25%
1866	1,704	−0.87%
1872	1,551	−1.56%
1876	1,343	−3.54%
1881	1,143	−3.17%
1886	946	−3.71%
1891	895	−1.10%
1896	966	+1.54%
1901	853	−2.46%

Year	Pop.	±% p.a.
1906	881	+0.65%
1911	843	−0.88%
1921	708	−1.73%
1926	763	+1.51%
1931	758	−0.13%
1936	728	−0.80%
1946	777	+0.65%
1954	827	+0.78%
1962	1,181	+4.55%
1968	2,016	+9.32%
1975	3,033	+6.01%
1982	4,473	+5.71%
1990	5,950	+3.63%
1999	7,127	+2.03%
2007	7,544	+0.71%
2012	7,453	−0.24%
2017	7,856	+1.06%
2023	8,479	+1.28%

Source: EHESS and INSEE (1968-2023)

== Personalities ==
- Jean Joseph Marius Diouloufet, Provençal writer, was born in Eguilles on 19 September 1771.

== See also ==
- Communes of the Bouches-du-Rhône department
