= Arboretum du Font de l'Orme =

Garden in France

Coordinates: 43.8°N 5.064°E

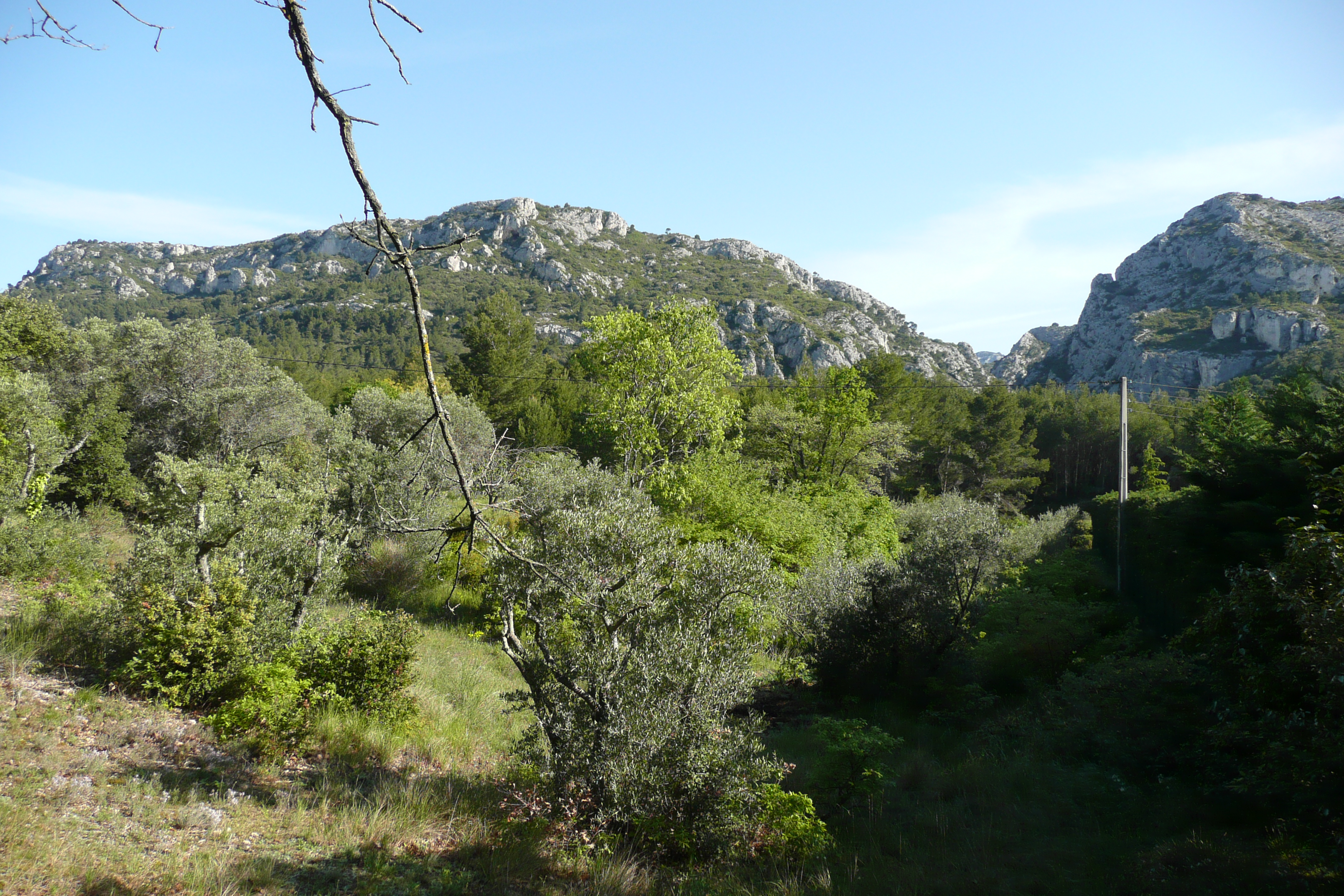
The gorges de Régallon

The Arboretum du Font de l'Orme is an arboretum located near the Gorges du Régalon in Font de l'Orme, Mérindol, Vaucluse, Provence-Alpes-Côte d'Azur, France. The arboretum contains about 20 species of identified trees, including four species of Mediterranean pine, and the forest house of the Font de l'Orme.

== See also ==
- List of botanical gardens in France
