= Jean Joseph Marius Diouloufet =

Provençal poet

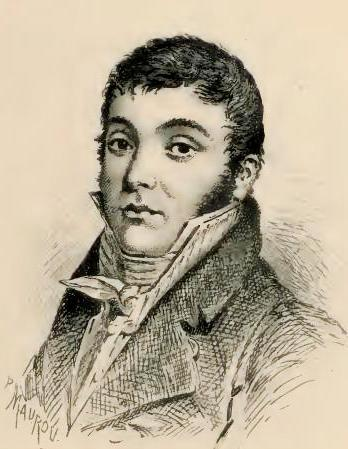
Jean Joseph

Jean Joseph Marius Diouloufet (19 September 1771, in Éguilles – 19 May 1840, in Cucuron) was a Provençal poet.

== Biography ==
As a seminarian, Diouloufet had to leave Provence for Italy with the advent of the French Revolution.

Under the Empire, he became a trader in Aix-en-Provence. He made friends with Ambroise Roux-Alphéran, who lived on the same street as him. A librarian in Aix, he was dismissed during the French Revolution of 1830.

His Provençal poetry, fables and tales didn't go unnoticed at the time of publication. His work is pervaded by the use of a very raw strand of Provençal. By the end of his life, he finished a French-Occitan dictionary.

He died from apoplexy.

== Bibliography ==
- 1819 : Lei Manhans (« silk verses » in provençal), poem in four parts (Leis Magnans, pouémo didactique, en quatre chants, eme de notos de la coumpousitien de M. Diouloufet)
- 1823 : Co-writes an anthology, Lo Boquet provençau.
- 1829 : Fablos, contes, epitros et autros pouesios prouvençalos (« Fables, poetry, epistles and other provençal poems »).
- 1841 : Le Don Quichotte philosophe ou Histoire de l'avocat Hablard.

Roux-Alphéran also mentions « his pleasant songs, popular throughout the South of France from 1814 to 1815 », namely Alléluia on the return of the Bourbons.
