= Communauté d'agglomération Luberon Monts de Vaucluse =

Luberon Monts de Vaucluse
- Communauté d'agglomération
- Interactive map of Luberon Monts de Vaucluse
- Coordinates: 43°48′N 05°09′E
- Country: France
- Region: Provence-Alpes-Côte d'Azur
- Department: Vaucluse
- No. of communes: 16
- Established: 2014
- Area: 356.4 km^{2} (137.6 sq mi)
- Population (2019): 55,034
  - Density: 154.4/km^{2} (399.9/sq mi)
- Website: www.luberonmontsdevaucluse.fr

Location of the Luberon Monts de Vaucluse intercommunal authority

Communauté d'agglomération Luberon Monts de Vaucluse is the communauté d'agglomération, an intercommunal structure, centred on the town of Cavaillon. It is located in the Vaucluse department, in the Provence-Alpes-Côte d'Azur region, southeastern France. Created in 2014, its seat is in Cavaillon. Its name refers to the Luberon and Vaucluse Mountains. Its area is 356.4 km^{2}. Its population was 55,034 in 2019, of which 26,236 in Cavaillon proper.

== Composition ==
The communauté d'agglomération consists of the following 16 communes:

1. Beaumettes
2. Cabrières-d'Avignon
3. Cavaillon
4. Cheval-Blanc
5. Gordes
6. Lagnes
7. Lauris
8. Lourmarin
9. Maubec
10. Mérindol
11. Oppède
12. Puget
13. Puyvert
14. Robion
15. Taillades
16. Vaugines
