= Puget, Vaucluse =

Puget
- Commune
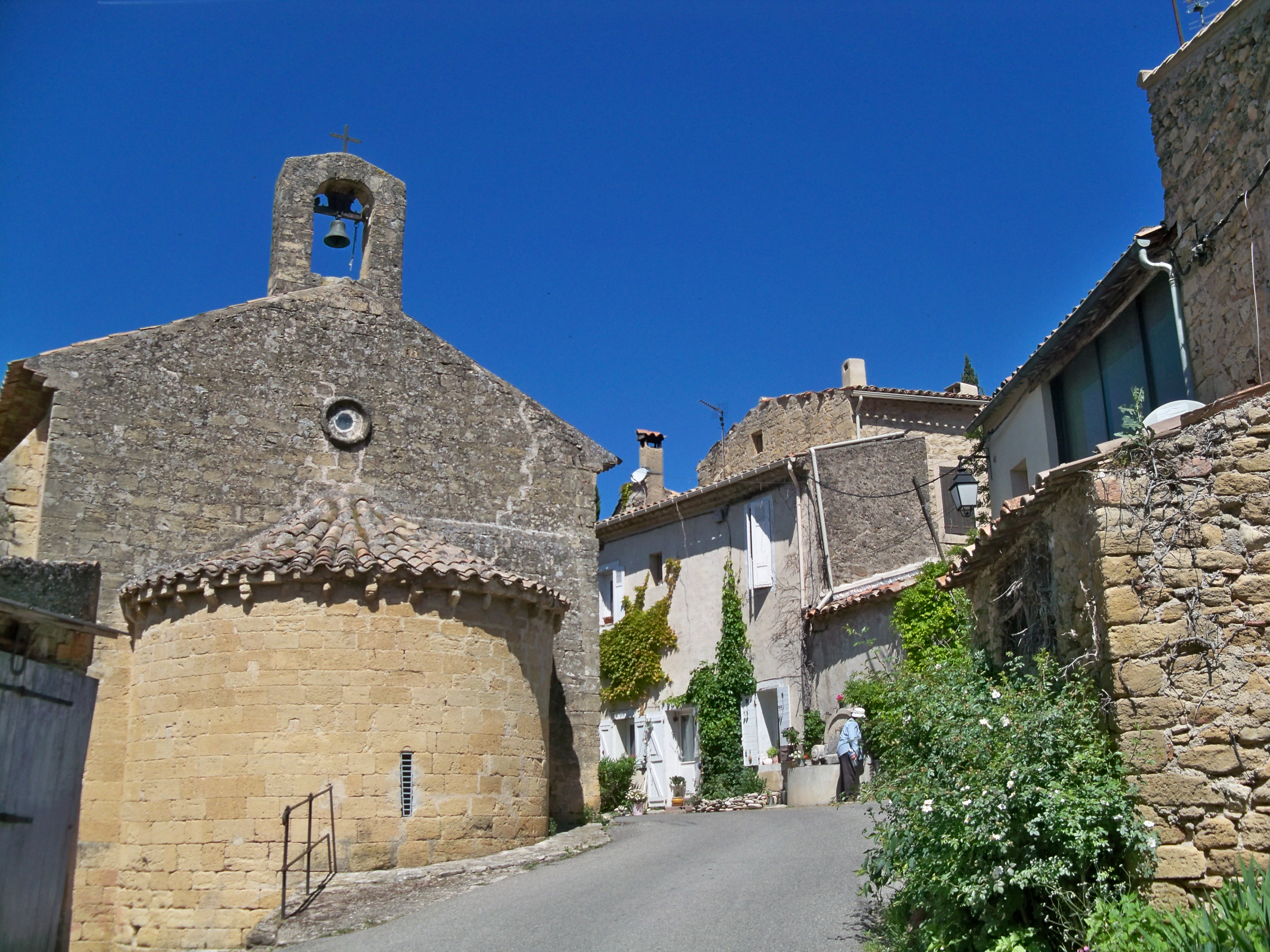
- Street in Puget

- Coat of arms
- Location of Puget
- Location within France Location within Provence-Alpes-Côte d'Azur
- Coordinates: 43°45′21″N 5°16′11″E
- Country: France
- Region: Provence-Alpes-Côte d'Azur
- Department: Vaucluse
- Arrondissement: Apt
- Canton: Cheval-Blanc
- Intercommunality: CA Luberon Monts de Vaucluse

Government
  - Mayor (2020–2026): Amélie Jean
- Area^{1}: 17.9 km^{2} (6.9 sq mi)
- Elevation: 150 m (490 ft)
- Highest elevation: 703 m (2,306 ft)
- Lowest elevation: 123 m (404 ft)
- Population (2023): 894
  - Density: 49.9/km^{2} (129/sq mi)
- Time zone: UTC+01:00 (CET)
  - Summer (DST): UTC+02:00 (CEST)
- INSEE/Postal code: 84093 /84360
- ^{1} French Land Register data, which excludes lakes, ponds, glaciers > 1 km^{2} (0.386 sq mi or 247 acres) and river estuaries.

Puget (French pronunciation: [pyʒɛ]) is a commune in the Vaucluse department in the Provence-Alpes-Côte d'Azur region in southeastern France.

== Personalities ==
The troubadour Bertran del Pojet hailed from Pojet, the Occitan name of modern Puget.

== See also ==
- Côtes du Luberon AOC
- Communes of the Vaucluse department
- Luberon
