= Lagnes =

- Commune
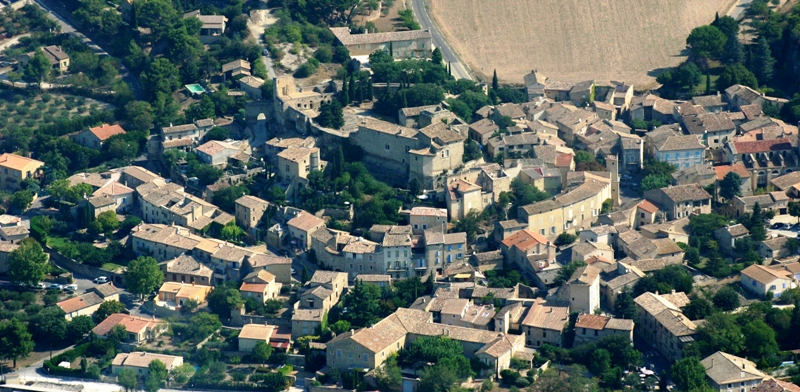
- An aerial view of Lagnes

- Coat of arms
- Location of Lagnes
- Location within France Location within Provence-Alpes-Côte d'Azur
- Coordinates: 43°53′39″N 5°06′55″E
- Country: France
- Region: Provence-Alpes-Côte d'Azur
- Department: Vaucluse
- Arrondissement: Apt
- Canton: Cheval-Blanc
- Intercommunality: CA Luberon Monts de Vaucluse

Government
  - Mayor (2020–2026): Claude Silvestre
- Area^{1}: 16.93 km^{2} (6.54 sq mi)
- Elevation: 110 m (360 ft)
- Highest elevation: 622 m (2,041 ft)
- Lowest elevation: 64 m (210 ft)
- Population (2023): 1,742
  - Density: 102.9/km^{2} (266.5/sq mi)
- Time zone: UTC+01:00 (CET)
  - Summer (DST): UTC+02:00 (CEST)
- INSEE/Postal code: 84062 /84800
- ^{1} French Land Register data, which excludes lakes, ponds, glaciers > 1 km^{2} (0.386 sq mi or 247 acres) and river estuaries.

Lagnes (French pronunciation: [laɲ]; Occitan: Lanhas) is a commune in the Vaucluse department in the Provence-Alpes-Côte d'Azur region in southeastern France.

== See also ==
- Communes of the Vaucluse department
