= Mérindol =

- Commune
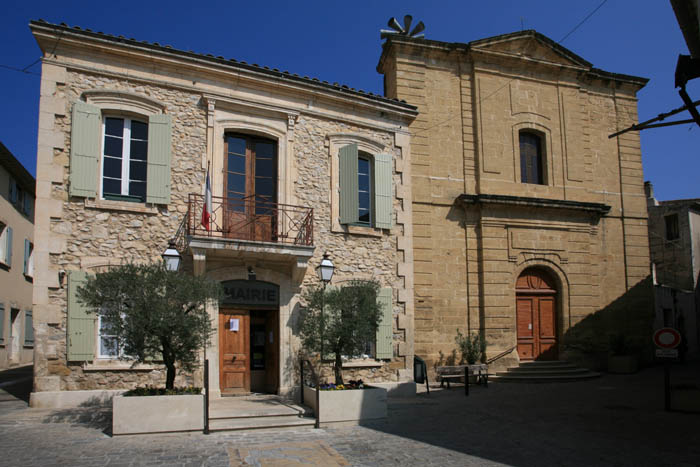
- Town hall and church

- Coat of arms
- Location of Mérindol
- Location within France Location within Provence-Alpes-Côte d'Azur
- Coordinates: 43°45′24″N 5°12′14″E
- Country: France
- Region: Provence-Alpes-Côte d'Azur
- Department: Vaucluse
- Arrondissement: Apt
- Canton: Cheval-Blanc
- Intercommunality: CA Luberon Monts de Vaucluse

Government
  - Mayor (2020–2026): Philippe Batoux
- Area^{1}: 26.59 km^{2} (10.27 sq mi)
- Elevation: 168 m (551 ft)
- Highest elevation: 620 m (2,030 ft)
- Lowest elevation: 100 m (330 ft)
- Population (2023): 2,283
  - Density: 85.86/km^{2} (222.4/sq mi)
- Time zone: UTC+01:00 (CET)
  - Summer (DST): UTC+02:00 (CEST)
- INSEE/Postal code: 84074 /84360
- ^{1} French Land Register data, which excludes lakes, ponds, glaciers > 1 km^{2} (0.386 sq mi or 247 acres) and river estuaries.

Mérindol (French pronunciation: [meʁɛ̃dɔl]; Occitan: Merindòu) is a commune in the Vaucluse department in the Provence-Alpes-Côte d'Azur region in southeastern France.

The village, located south of the Luberon massif, has some prominence in the plain of the Durance river which demarcates the Vaucluse and Bouches-du-Rhône departments. This plain has allowed the municipality to develop an agriculture which remains relatively important for its economy. Its history, like that of several other villages in the Luberon, was marked by the French Wars of Religion.

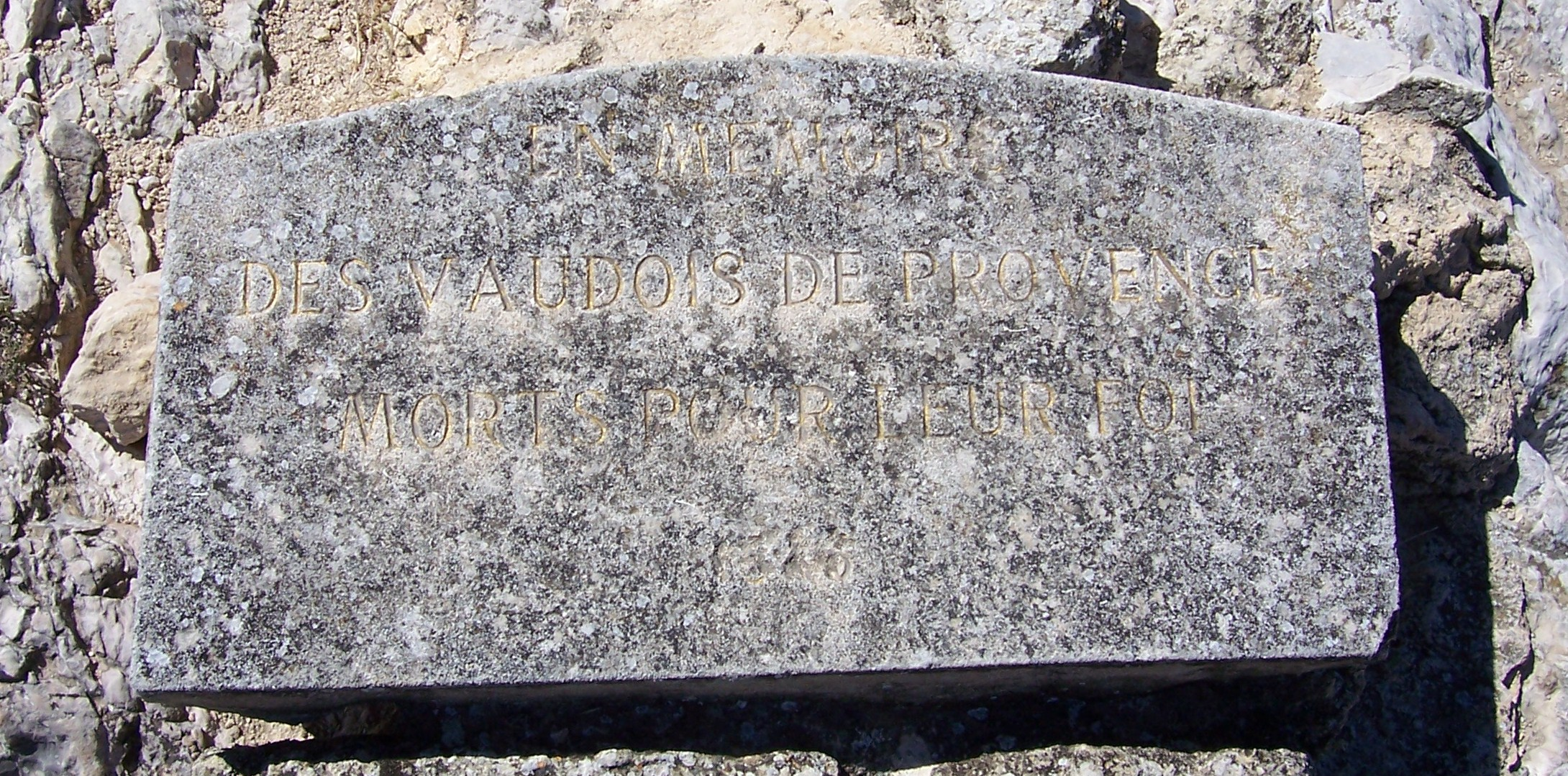
Mérindol plaque "In memory of the Waldensians who died for their faith" − commemorating victims of the 16th century Massacre of Mérindol.

== Population ==
Historical population
Year	Pop.	±% p.a.
1968	869	—
1975	1,021	+2.33%
1982	1,221	+2.59%
1990	1,521	+2.78%
1999	1,798	+1.88%
2007	1,926	+0.86%
2012	1,987	+0.63%
2017	2,097	+1.08%
2023	2,283	+1.43%
Source: INSEE

== Points of interest ==
- Arboretum du Font de l'Orme
- Massacre of Mérindol

== See also ==
- Côtes du Luberon AOC
- Communes of the Vaucluse department
- Luberon
