= Puyvert =

- Commune
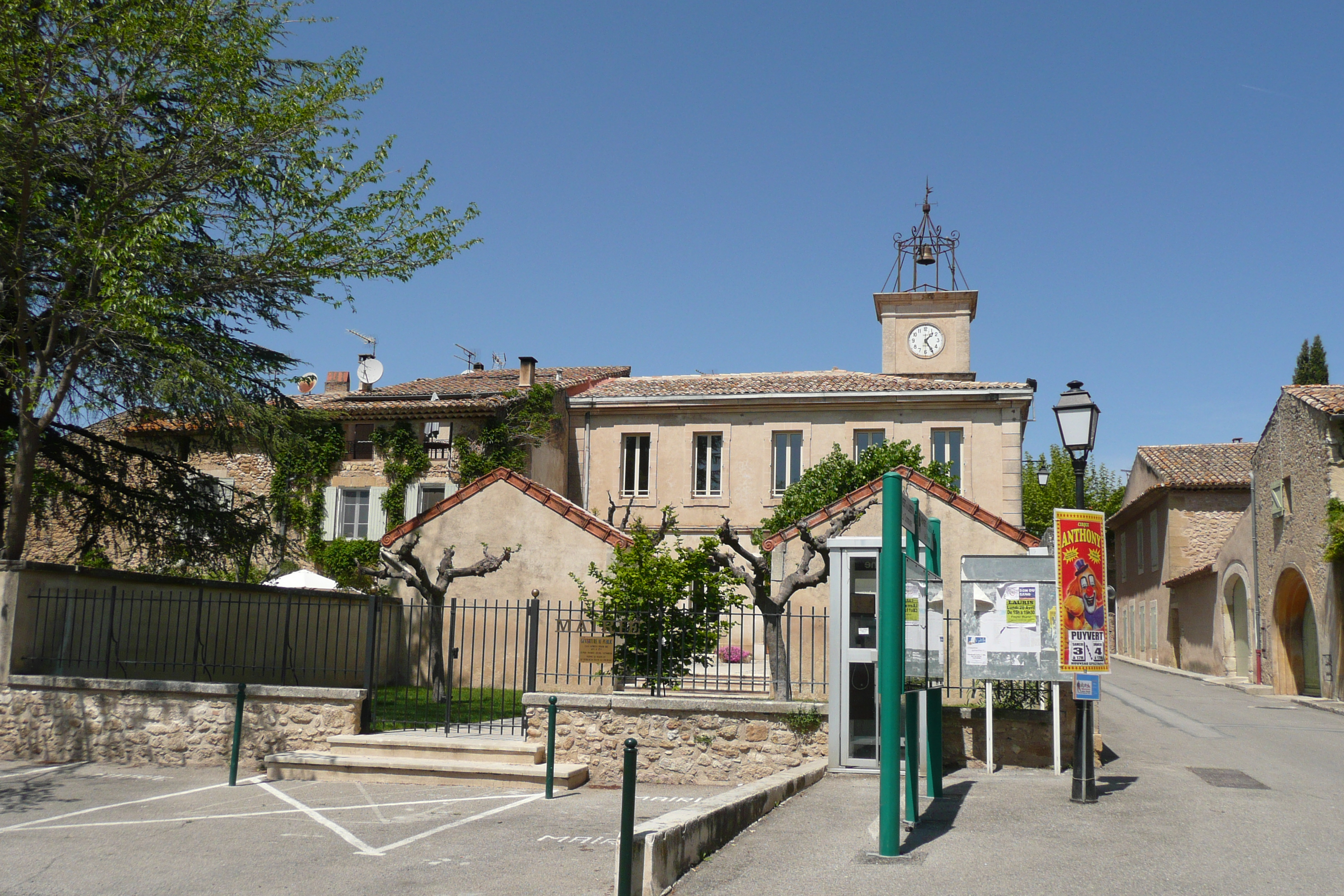
- A view within the village of Puyvert

- Coat of arms
- Location of Puyvert
- Location within France Location within Provence-Alpes-Côte d'Azur
- Coordinates: 43°45′36″N 5°20′38″E
- Country: France
- Region: Provence-Alpes-Côte d'Azur
- Department: Vaucluse
- Arrondissement: Apt
- Canton: Cheval-Blanc
- Intercommunality: CA Luberon Monts de Vaucluse

Government
  - Mayor (2020–2026): Sylvie Gregoire
- Area^{1}: 9.78 km^{2} (3.78 sq mi)
- Elevation: 150 m (490 ft)
- Highest elevation: 615 m (2,018 ft)
- Lowest elevation: 141 m (463 ft)
- Population (2023): 865
  - Density: 88.4/km^{2} (229/sq mi)
- Time zone: UTC+01:00 (CET)
  - Summer (DST): UTC+02:00 (CEST)
- INSEE/Postal code: 84095 /84160
- ^{1} French Land Register data, which excludes lakes, ponds, glaciers > 1 km^{2} (0.386 sq mi or 247 acres) and river estuaries.

Puyvert (French pronunciation: [pɥivɛʁ]; Occitan: Puègvèrd) is a commune in the Vaucluse department in the Provence-Alpes-Côte d'Azur region in southeastern France.

Puyvert borders the Bouches du Rhone department, sitting on the river Durance.

The former priory of Saint-Pierre de Mejans was seized by the state during the French Revolution and is now managed as a chateau vineyard and events venue.

== See also ==
- Côtes du Luberon AOC
- Communes of the Vaucluse department
- Luberon
