= Vaugines =

- Commune
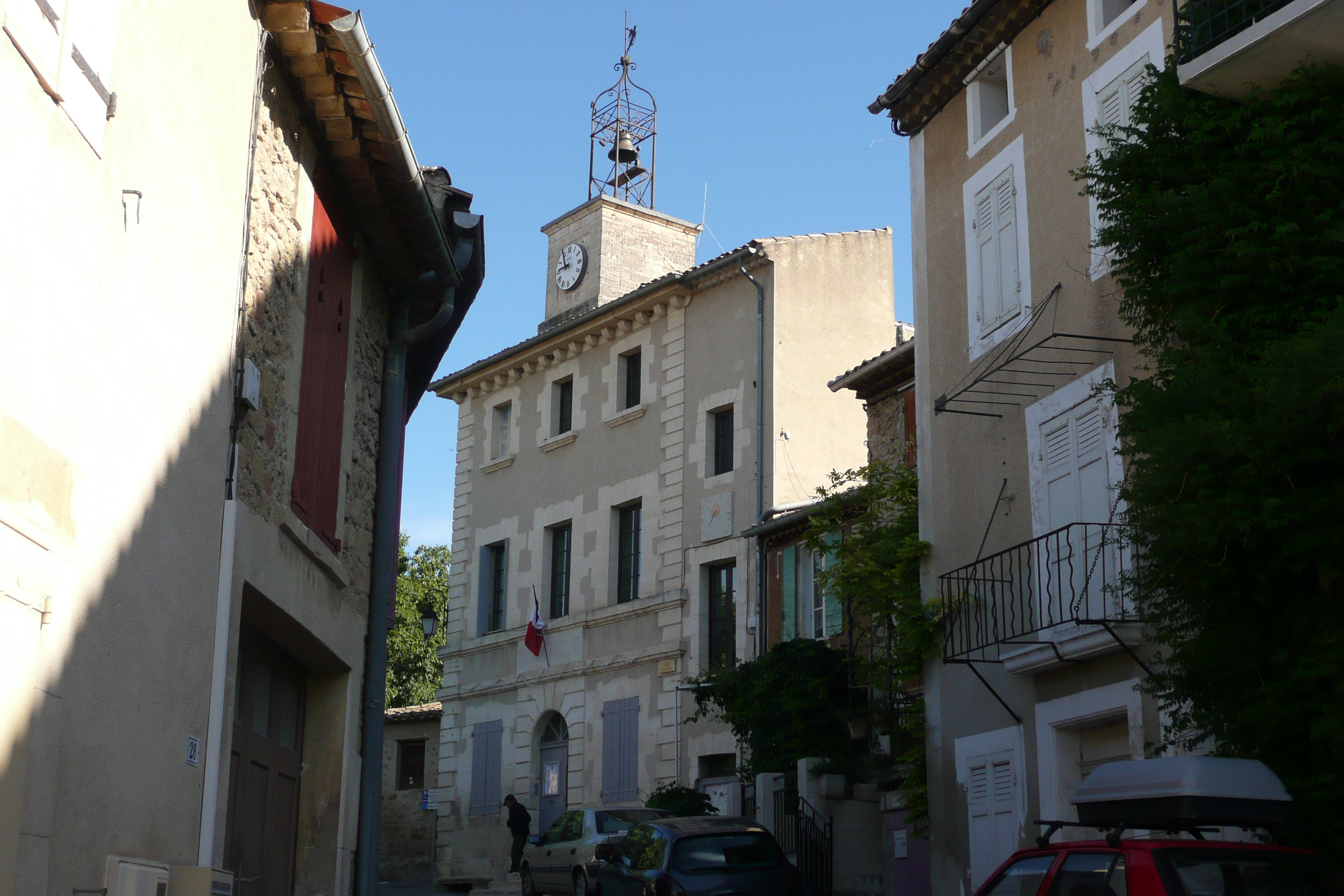
- Town hall

- Coat of arms
- Location of Vaugines
- Location within France Location within Provence-Alpes-Côte d'Azur
- Coordinates: 43°46′47″N 5°24′55″E
- Country: France
- Region: Provence-Alpes-Côte d'Azur
- Department: Vaucluse
- Arrondissement: Apt
- Canton: Cheval-Blanc
- Intercommunality: CA Luberon Monts de Vaucluse

Government
  - Mayor (2020–2026): Frédérique Angeletti
- Area^{1}: 15.55 km^{2} (6.00 sq mi)
- Elevation: 750 m (2,460 ft)
- Highest elevation: 902 m (2,959 ft)
- Lowest elevation: 211 m (692 ft)
- Population (2023): 553
  - Density: 35.6/km^{2} (92.1/sq mi)
- Time zone: UTC+01:00 (CET)
  - Summer (DST): UTC+02:00 (CEST)
- INSEE/Postal code: 84140 /84160
- ^{1} French Land Register data, which excludes lakes, ponds, glaciers > 1 km^{2} (0.386 sq mi or 247 acres) and river estuaries.

Vaugines (French pronunciation: [voʒin]; Occitan: Vaugina) is a commune in the Vaucluse department in the Provence-Alpes-Côte d'Azur region in southeastern France.

It lies on the southern slopes of the Luberon Massif.

Vaugines has preserved its Provençal style, with its peaceful decorated lanes of traditional stone rural houses. The countryside surrounding Vaugines is wild and typical of Provence, and was chosen by film director Claude Berri for the filming of parts of his adaptions of Marcel Pagnol's novels Jean de Florette and Manon des Sources.

British expatriate writer Peter Mayle lived in Vaugines until his death in 2018. One of his books, A Year in Provence, giving the chronicle of a British expatriate who settled in the village of Ménerbes, was made into a TV series and a film. Another of his books was also made into the film A Good Year (2006) directed by Ridley Scott and starring Russell Crowe, which was filmed nearby in the same region. As a result, in recent decades the Luberon and its towns and villages became better known in the English-speaking world.

== See also ==
- Côtes du Luberon AOC
- Communes of the Vaucluse department
