= Lourmarin =

- Commune
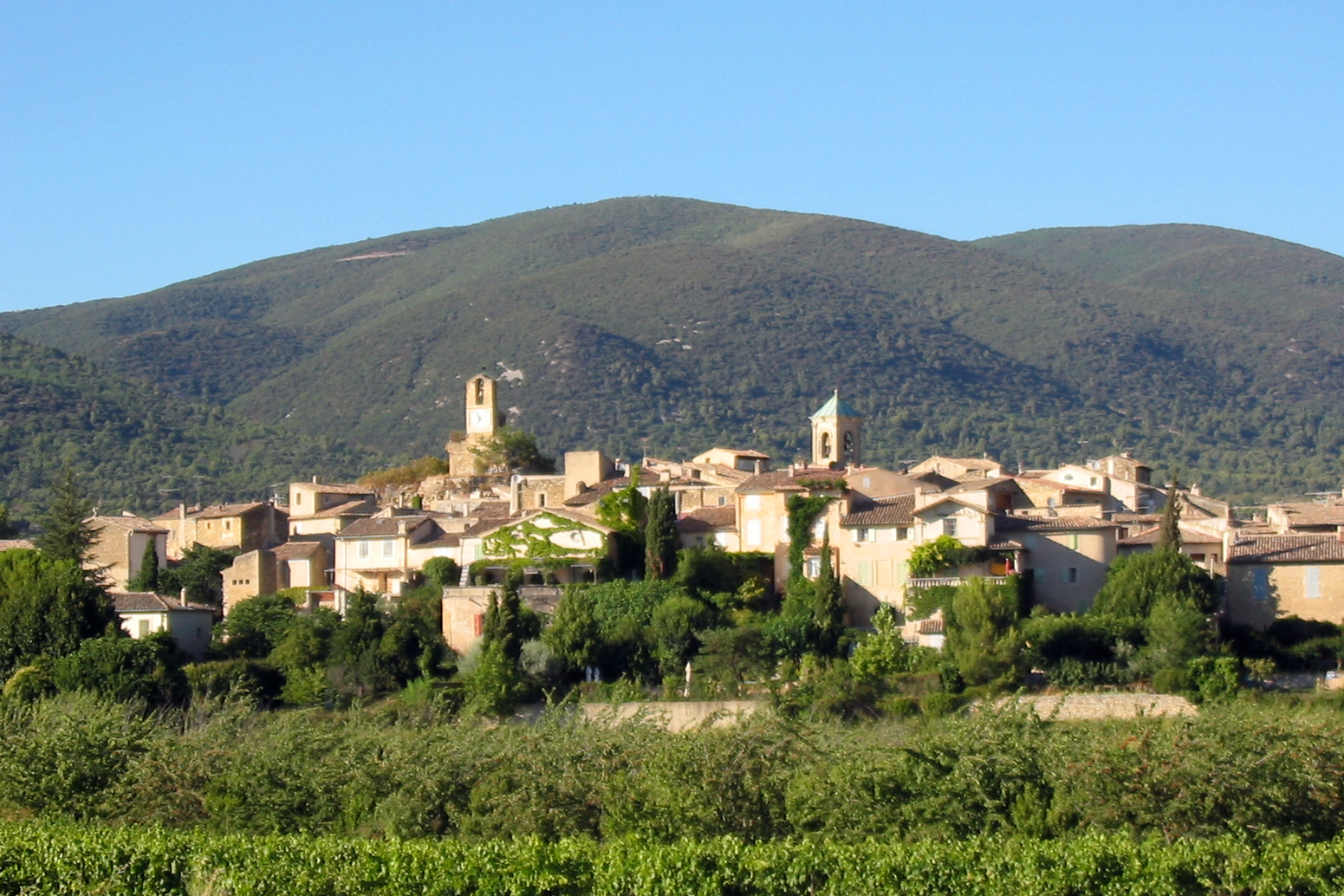
- View of Lourmarin with vineyards and orchards

- Coat of arms
- Location of Lourmarin
- Location within France Location within Provence-Alpes-Côte d'Azur
- Coordinates: 43°46′11″N 5°21′47″E
- Country: France
- Region: Provence-Alpes-Côte d'Azur
- Department: Vaucluse
- Arrondissement: Apt
- Canton: Cheval-Blanc
- Intercommunality: CA Luberon Monts de Vaucluse

Government
  - Mayor (2020–2026): Jean-Pierre Pettavino
- Area^{1}: 20.18 km^{2} (7.79 sq mi)
- Elevation: 200 m (660 ft)
- Highest elevation: 818 m (2,684 ft)
- Lowest elevation: 169 m (554 ft)
- Population (2023): 1,020
  - Density: 50.5/km^{2} (131/sq mi)
- Time zone: UTC+01:00 (CET)
  - Summer (DST): UTC+02:00 (CEST)
- INSEE/Postal code: 84068 /84160
- ^{1} French Land Register data, which excludes lakes, ponds, glaciers > 1 km^{2} (0.386 sq mi or 247 acres) and river estuaries.

Lourmarin (French pronunciation: [luʁmaʁɛ̃]; Occitan: Lormarin) is a commune in the Vaucluse department in the Provence-Alpes-Côte d'Azur region in southeastern France. Its inhabitants are called Lourmarinois.

== Geography ==
Lourmarin is located in the French region of Provence, at the foot of the Luberon Massif where a southern pass debouches over the Luberon from Apt on the northern side of the Luberon. The pass divides the Grand Luberon from the Petit Luberon range, an area rich in Neolithic remains and noted for its dramatic massifs and rockscapes. The Aigues Brun brook comes out of the pass and runs just to the west of the village (Aigue is a Provençal language word for "water", coming from Latin aqua).

== History ==
Lourmarin has been settled for at least a thousand years, and was probably a Neolithic campsite before that.

A fortress was first built at the site in the 12th century, and was rebuilt by Foulques d'Agoult in the 15th century on the foundations of the earlier castle. It was restored in 1920.

In 1545 the town was burned down because its population was predominantly Waldensian protestant.

Its mayor between 2001 and 2017 was Blaise Diagne, grandson of the like-named first Black African deputy and member of a French government.

== Sights ==
A member of Les Plus Beaux Villages de France (The Most Beautiful Villages of France) Association, Lourmarin nestles in the middle of vineyards, olive groves and almond trees.

The village is a popular tourist destination, with notable landmarks including its Renaissance castle, Catholic and Protestant churches, and views of the Proches Bastides, a large fortified farmhouse dating to the Middle Ages. A chapel originally built for Protestant worship stands between the castle and the village. The Durance River is approximately 20 minutes away by car, while Aix-en-Provence is a further 40-minute drive.

== Miscellaneous ==
Lourmarin was the birthplace of Philippe de Girard (1775–1845), an engineer and inventor of the linen spinning mill, as well as the name-sake for the town of Żyrardów in Poland (a toponym derived from the polonised spelling of Girard's name). Żyrardów is Lourmarin's twin town.

The writers Henri Bosco (1888–1976) and Albert Camus (1913–1960) both lived there and are buried in the local cemetery. The biophysicist Jacques Ricard (1929–2018) also lived after his retirement in Lourmarin, and is also buried in the cemetery.

=== Twin towns – Sister cities ===
Lourmarin is twinned with:

- Żyrardów in Poland

== Gallery ==
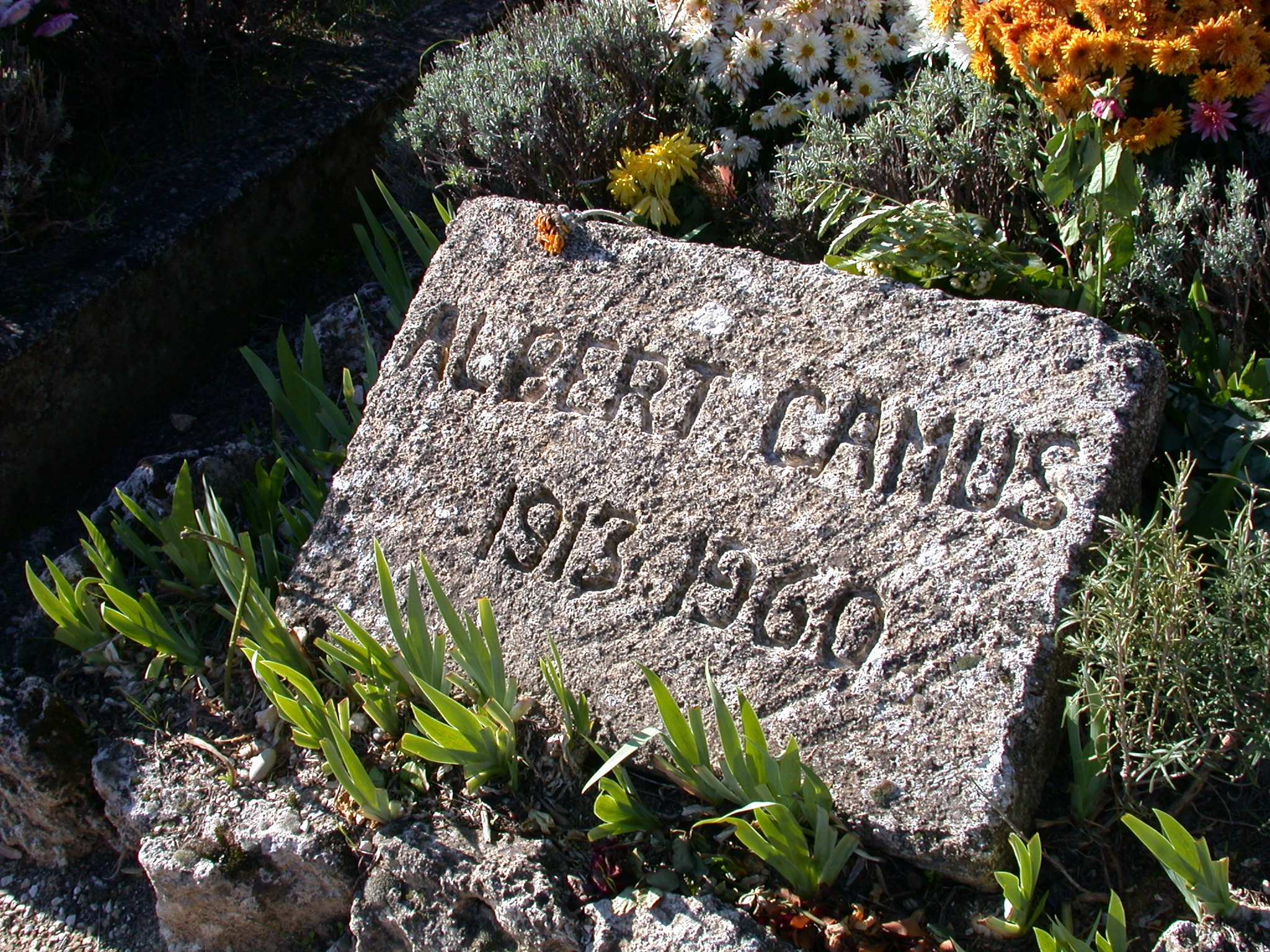
Albert Camus' tombstone in Lourmarin

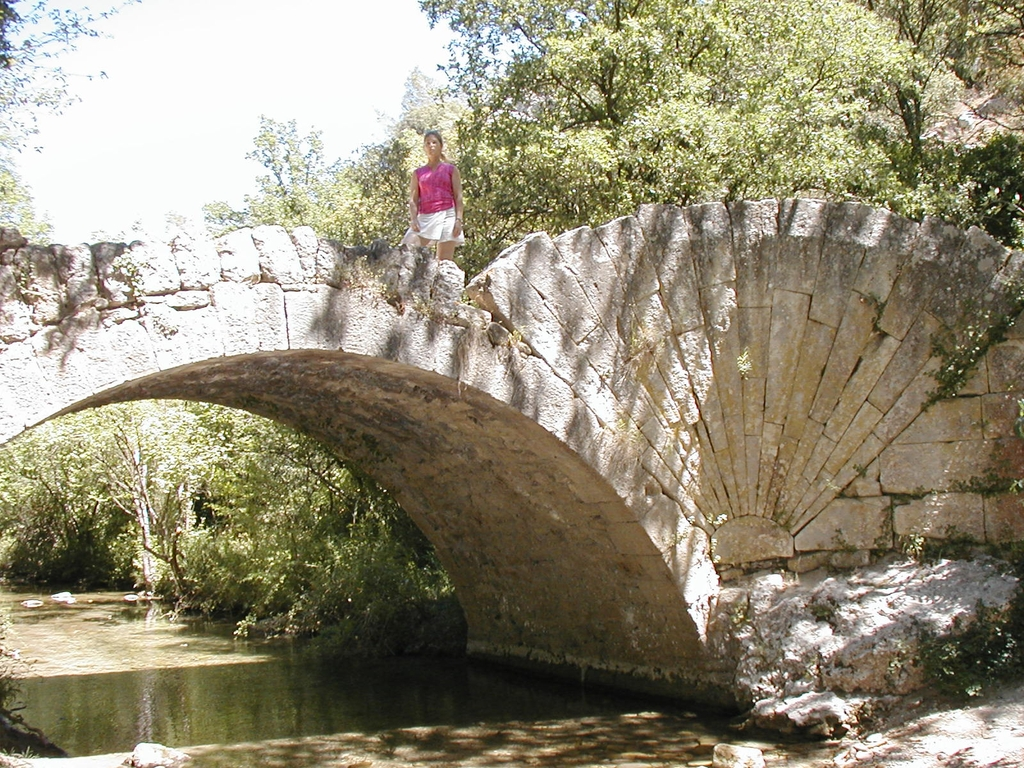
Pont à la Coquille over Aigue Brun. The bridge is on the territory of the commune of Bonnieux.

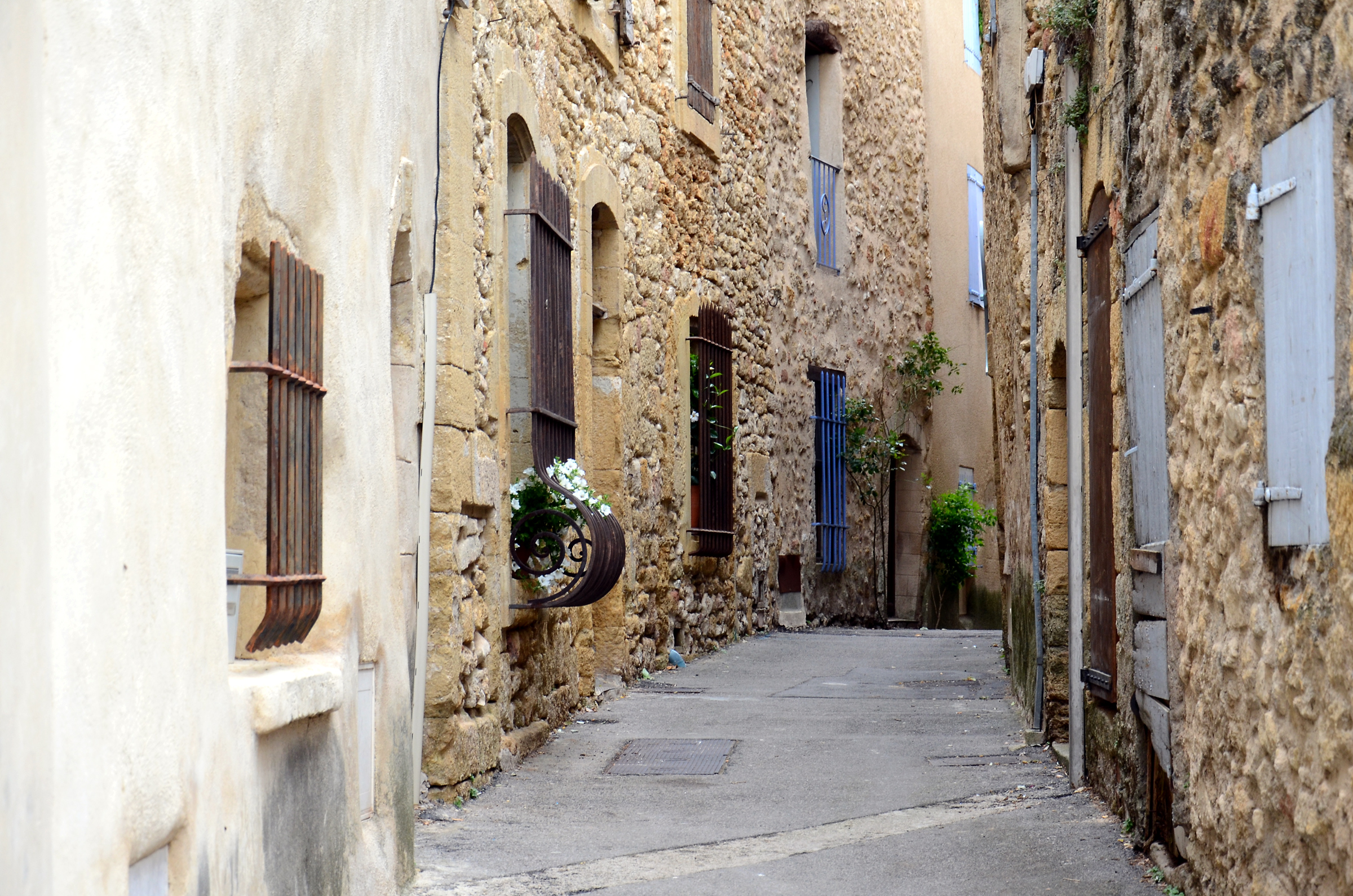
Lourmarin

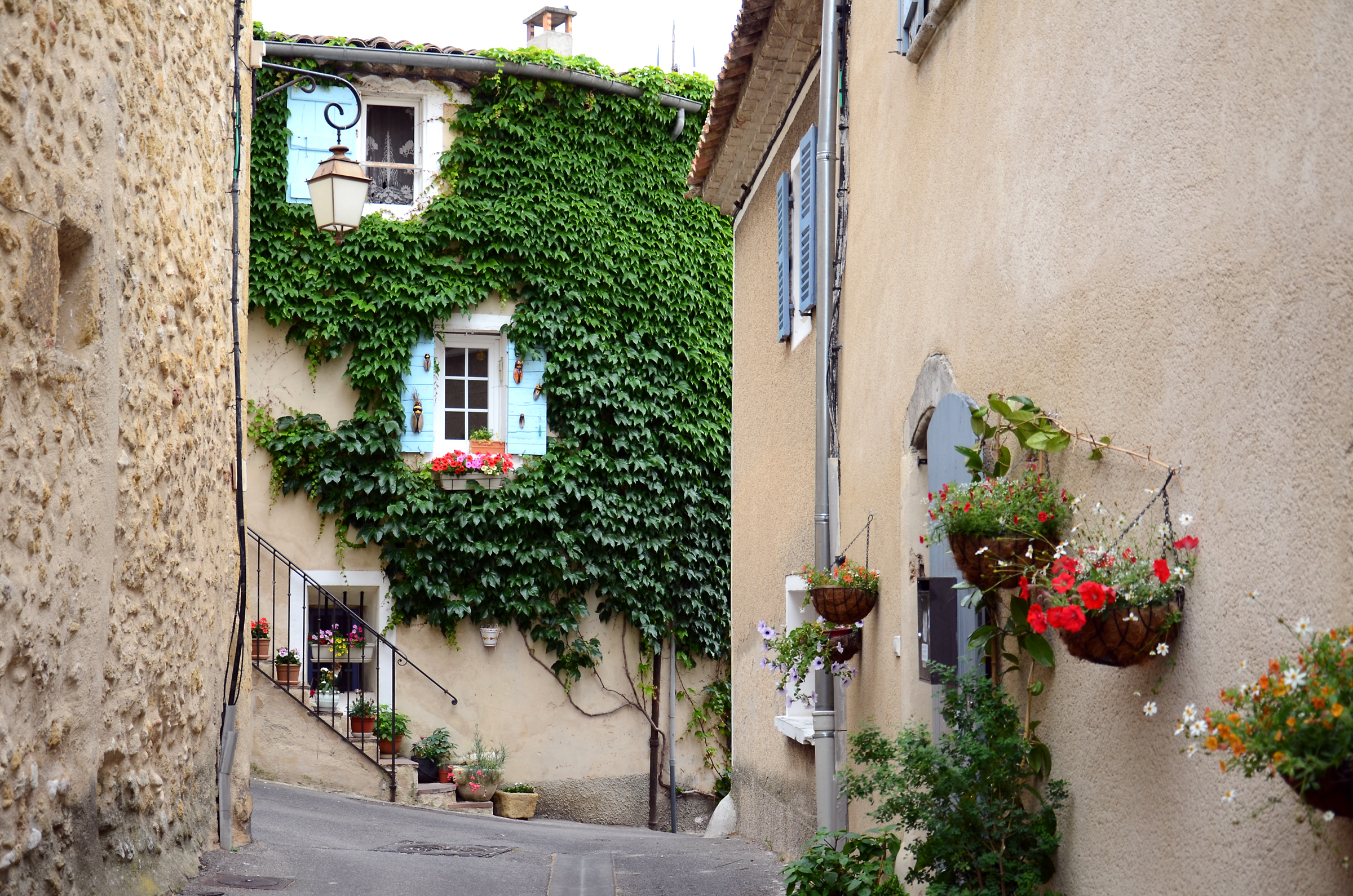
Lourmarin

== See also ==
- Côtes du Luberon AOC
