= Lauris =

- Commune
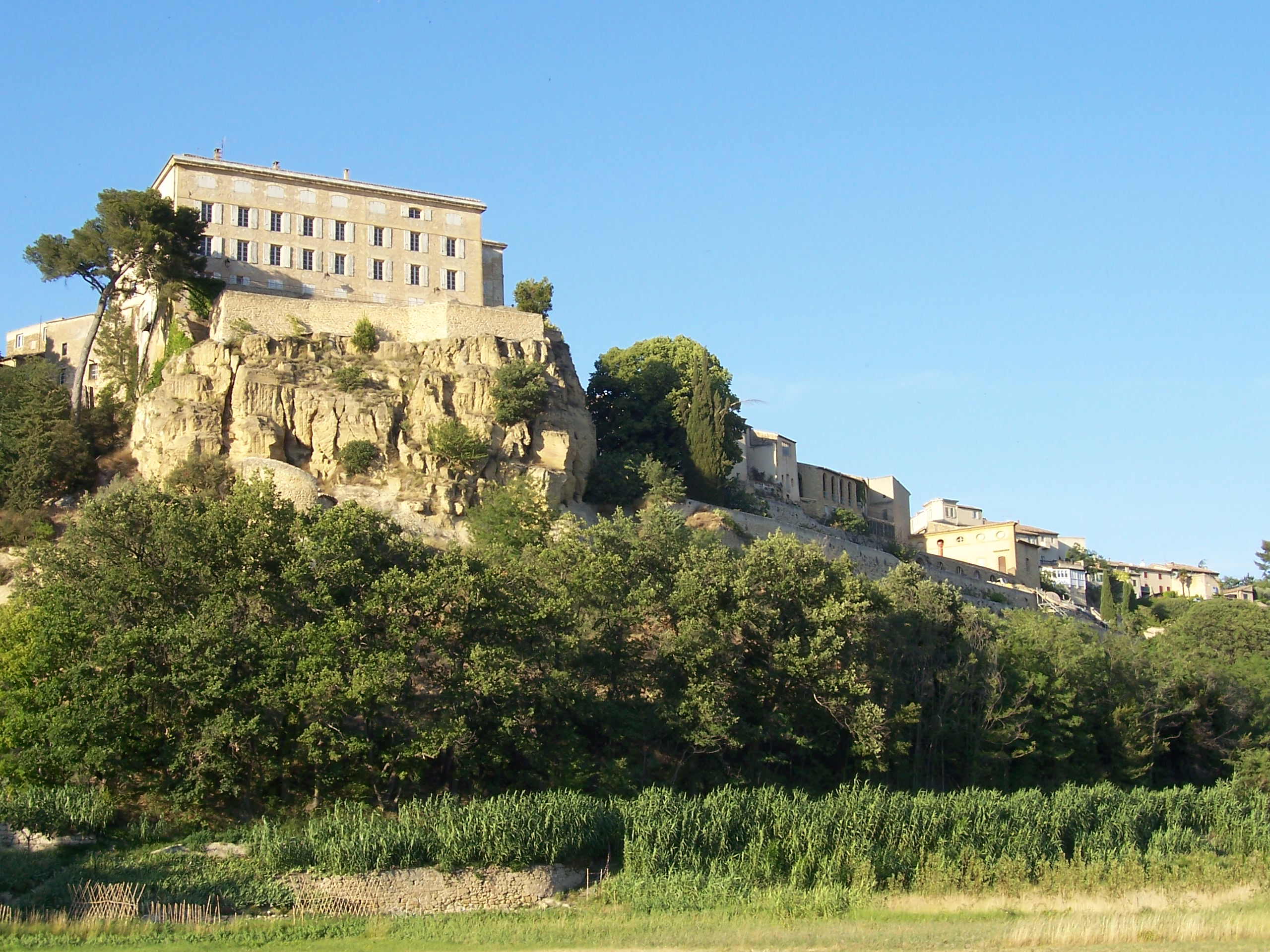
- Castle of Lauris

- Coat of arms
- Location of Lauris
- Location within France Location within Provence-Alpes-Côte d'Azur
- Coordinates: 43°44′52″N 5°18′49″E
- Country: France
- Region: Provence-Alpes-Côte d'Azur
- Department: Vaucluse
- Arrondissement: Apt
- Canton: Cheval-Blanc
- Intercommunality: CA Luberon Monts de Vaucluse

Government
  - Mayor (2020–2026): André Rousset
- Area^{1}: 21.81 km^{2} (8.42 sq mi)
- Elevation: 350 m (1,150 ft)
- Highest elevation: 680 m (2,230 ft)
- Lowest elevation: 128 m (420 ft)
- Population (2023): 3,921
  - Density: 179.8/km^{2} (465.6/sq mi)
- Time zone: UTC+01:00 (CET)
  - Summer (DST): UTC+02:00 (CEST)
- INSEE/Postal code: 84065 /84360
- ^{1} French Land Register data, which excludes lakes, ponds, glaciers > 1 km^{2} (0.386 sq mi or 247 acres) and river estuaries.

Lauris (French pronunciation: [loʁis]; Occitan: Làurias) is a commune in the Vaucluse department in the Provence-Alpes-Côte d'Azur region in southeastern France.

It is located between the Luberon and the Durance river.

== Population ==
Historical population
| Year | Pop. | ±% p.a. |
|---|---|---|
| 1968 | 1,558 | — |
| 1975 | 1,620 | +0.56% |
| 1982 | 1,810 | +1.60% |
| 1990 | 2,571 | +4.48% |
| 1999 | 3,102 | +2.11% |
| 2007 | 3,302 | +0.78% |
| 2012 | 3,789 | +2.79% |
| 2017 | 3,856 | +0.35% |
| 2023 | 3,921 | +0.28% |
Source: INSEE

== See also ==
- Côtes du Luberon AOC
- Communes of the Vaucluse department
