= Dôa =

River in France

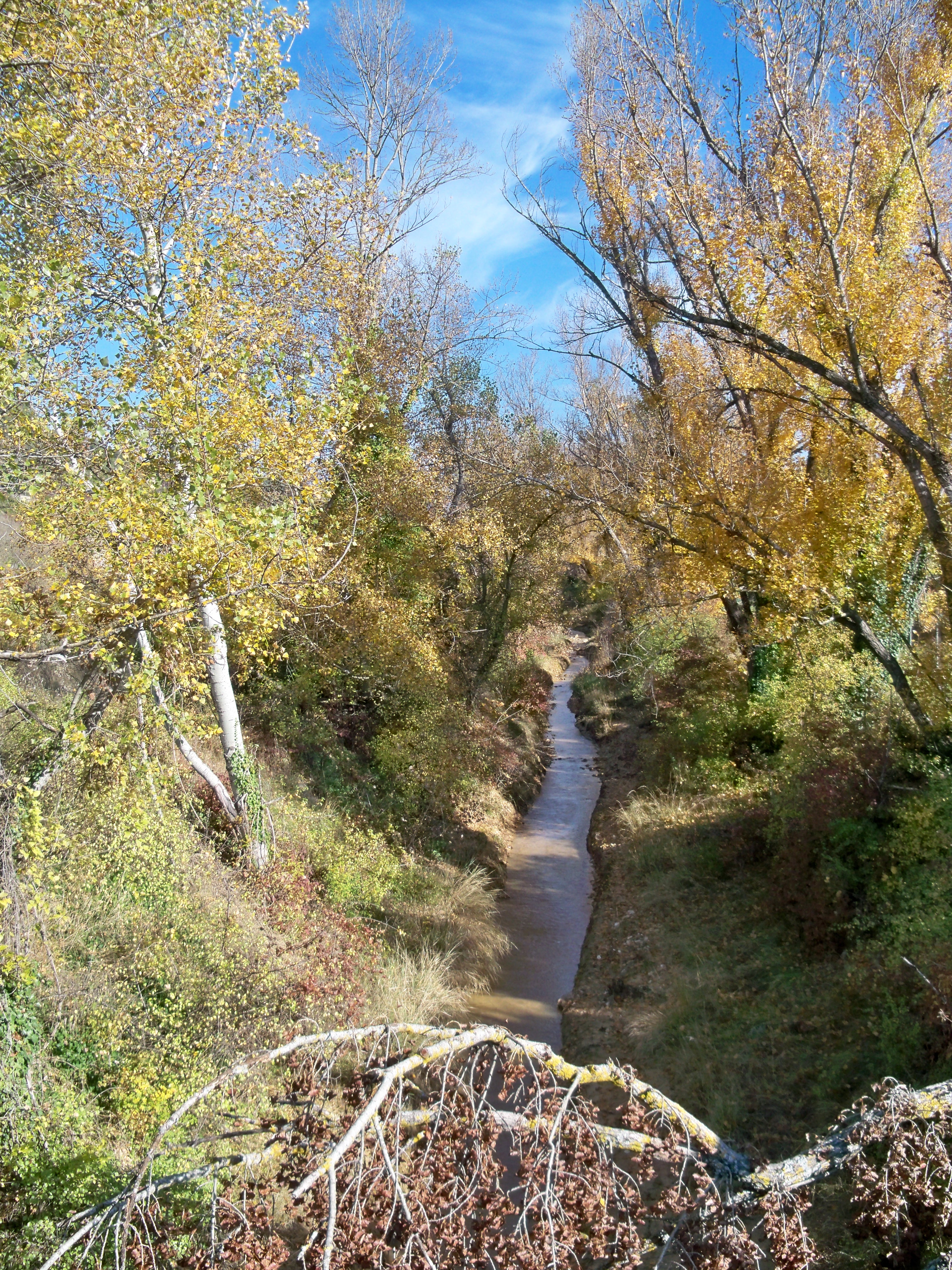
- The Dôa at the pont des Gondonnets, north of Apt

- Location within France Location within Provence-Alpes-Côte d'Azur
- Etymology: From Latin Lutosa, derived from loam

Physical characteristics
- Source: Viens
  - location: 43°53′46″N 5°34′03″E
- Mouth: Calavon, Apt
  - coordinates: 43°52′48″N 5°25′17″E
- Length: 15.8 kilometres (9.8 mi)
- Basin size: 71 square kilometres (27 sq mi)

Basin features
- Progression: Calavon→ Durance→ Rhône→ Mediterranean Sea

The Dôa is a torrent in the French department of the Vaucluse. From its source near the town of Viens it flows along the southern flanks of the Vaucluse mountains until flowing into the Calavon near Apt. Via the Calavon, the stream belongs to the catchment area of the Durance and Rhône.

== Geography ==
=== Itinerary ===
The Dôa takes its source on the territory of the community of Viens, northwest of the castle and the Collet de Falquerol, near the crossing of the D22 en D33. Starting in Viens, the Dôa subsequently passes through Gignac and Rustrel before flowing into the Calavon east of the city of Apt. Before flowing through the Provençal Colorado in Rustrel, it runs through a series of valleys surrounded by hills forming the feet of the Vaucluse mountain range. During heavy thunderstorms, the water in the river mixes with the Ochre rich sediments and argillaceous loam from the Colorado, giving the stream a yellow color. After leaving Rustrel, the Dôa leaves its east–west trajectory and turns South toward the Calavon.

=== Accessibility ===
Apart from a small section where the stream flows through the Provençal Colorado at Rustrel, the river runs largely parallel to the D22 departmental road.

=== Tributaries ===
Multiple small streams running in valleys and gorges end in the Dôa over the course of its 16 km itinerary. Between these are found the Piedgros, Soured and Rebrondade.

== Etymology ==
The first texts bearing a reference to the Dôa are found in the chartulary of the church of Apt. The stream is called the Rivus Luctuosa or Lutosa (literally "Loamy") in a document dating back to 906. The name then further evolved and is later called the Lodoza, Luctuosa and finally Doza in a document form 1401, from which the present name Dôa is derived.
