= Yves Zurstrassen =

Belgian abstract painter

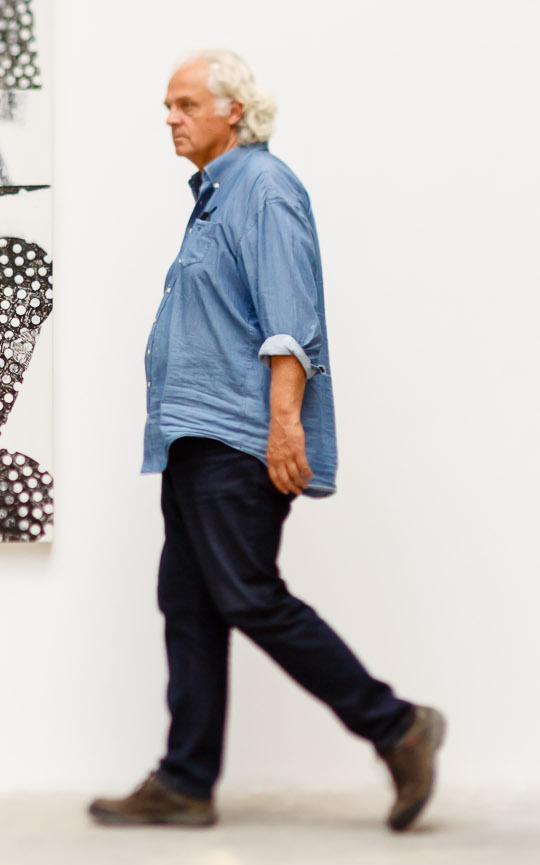
Yves Zurstrassen (Belgium, 1956) in his studio, in the movie of Michelle Porter Yves Zurstrassen, painter, 2017

Yves Zurstrassen (1956) is a Belgian abstract painter. He lives and works in Brussels (Belgium) and in Viens (France).

Yves Zurstrassen's painting is a work always in motion, navigating between lyrical abstraction and abstract expressionism. His approach plays with the general principle of collage and “décollage” of various types of thin paper on successive layers of colour.

== Biography ==
Yves Zurstrassen was born in Liège in 1956. After a childhood in the Vesdre valley (between the Ardennes and Hautes Fagnes) he left Verviers at the age of 10 with his family to settle in Brussels following the decline of the wool industry. A more turbulent period followed for the adolescent, between the hippie movement and truancy, with one certainty: his world was in painting. At the age of 18 he started to paint, alternating studio work with long periods of work in France, in the charterhouse of La Verne, or in Andalusia, where he painted outdoors. His work was highly influenced by these stays. He exhibited for the first time in Brussels in 1982.

A self-taught painter with training in the graphic arts, he learned his craft in the 80s among the artists’ studios and retrospectives of the masters of abstract expressionism, Jackson Pollock, Willem de Kooning, Cy Twombly and Mark Tobey, in opposition to the standard idea at that time in France of the death of painting. Zurstrassen deliberately chose to focus on the rectangle of the painting, with only the stretchers, the canvas, paper, and paint, to seek new freedom of expression.

At the end of the 90s, he settled in a disused industrial building that he adapted to his work and studies. Starting in the 2000s his approach evolved, inspired also by his love of the Dada movement, of Kurt Schwitters; at first through small format studies that occupied a more important place in his work; his technique was enhanced by collages of torn, cut-out newsprint integrated into the picture and then detached, removing the paint. He says that he opens windows in the memory of the picture. He integrates into these collages shapes cut from photos that he takes in the public space, urban motifs or details of everyday life, and digitally reworks, as in the monumental (94 m) work installed in the Gare de l'Ouest [Brussels-West Station] in Brussels in 2009. The beginning of the 2010 decade saw the cut-out motifs, which at the beginning were placed on the surface of the composition, change place to completely cover the background.

Jazz and free jazz play an important role in the work of Zurstrassen, strongly influenced in his work by great musicians like John Coltrane, Ornette Coleman, Eric Dolphy and Evan Parker, with whom he "communicates through painting."

== Exhibitions ==
=== Group exhibitions ===
- 1983 "Fremmed Tiltraekning", Holstebro Museum, Holstebro (DK)
- 1993 Musée d'art moderne André-Malraux, Le Havre (FR)
- 2006 "Abstractions construites en Communauté française de Belgique de 1980 à nos jours", Bruxelles (BE)
- 2008 "Le BAM se dévoile", Musée des Beaux-Arts, Mons (BE)
- 2010, "Cobra & Co", Latvian National Museum of Art, Riga (LVA)
- 2012 "The vicinity of constellations" Atelier 340 Muzeum, Bruxelles (BE) / BVA Katowice (PL)
- 2014 "Basic Research / Notes on the Collection", Museum Kurhaus, Kleve (DE)
- 2016 "Hartung et les peintres lyriques", Fonds Hélène et Edouard Leclerc pour la Culture, Landerneau (FR)

=== Individual exhibitions ===
- 1982 Galerie Charles Kriwin, Bruxelles (BE)
- 1989 Galerie Rodolphe Janssen, Bruxelles (BE)
- 1994 Galerie Bernard Cats, Bruxelles (BE)
- 2001 Galerie Xippas, paris
- 2006 Musée d'art moderne et d'art contemporain de Liège
- 2008 Aboa Betus & Art Nova Museum, Turku (FI)
- 2009 "Grid Paintings", IKOB - Museum für Zeitgenössische Kunst, Eupen (BE)
- 2011 Fundacion Antonio Perez, Cuenca, (SP)
- 2011 Carreras Mugica, Bilbao (SP)
- 2012 "Free", Galerie Triangle Bleu, Stavelot (BE)
- 2012 "Beginnings" Galerie Eric Linard La Garde Adhémar (FR)
- 2014 "Pattern Paintings", Galerie Valérie Bach, Bruxelles (BE)
- 2014 "Texture de la Mémoire", le Salon d'Art, Bruxelles (BE)
- 2017 Galerie Xippas Genève, (CH)
