= Calavon =

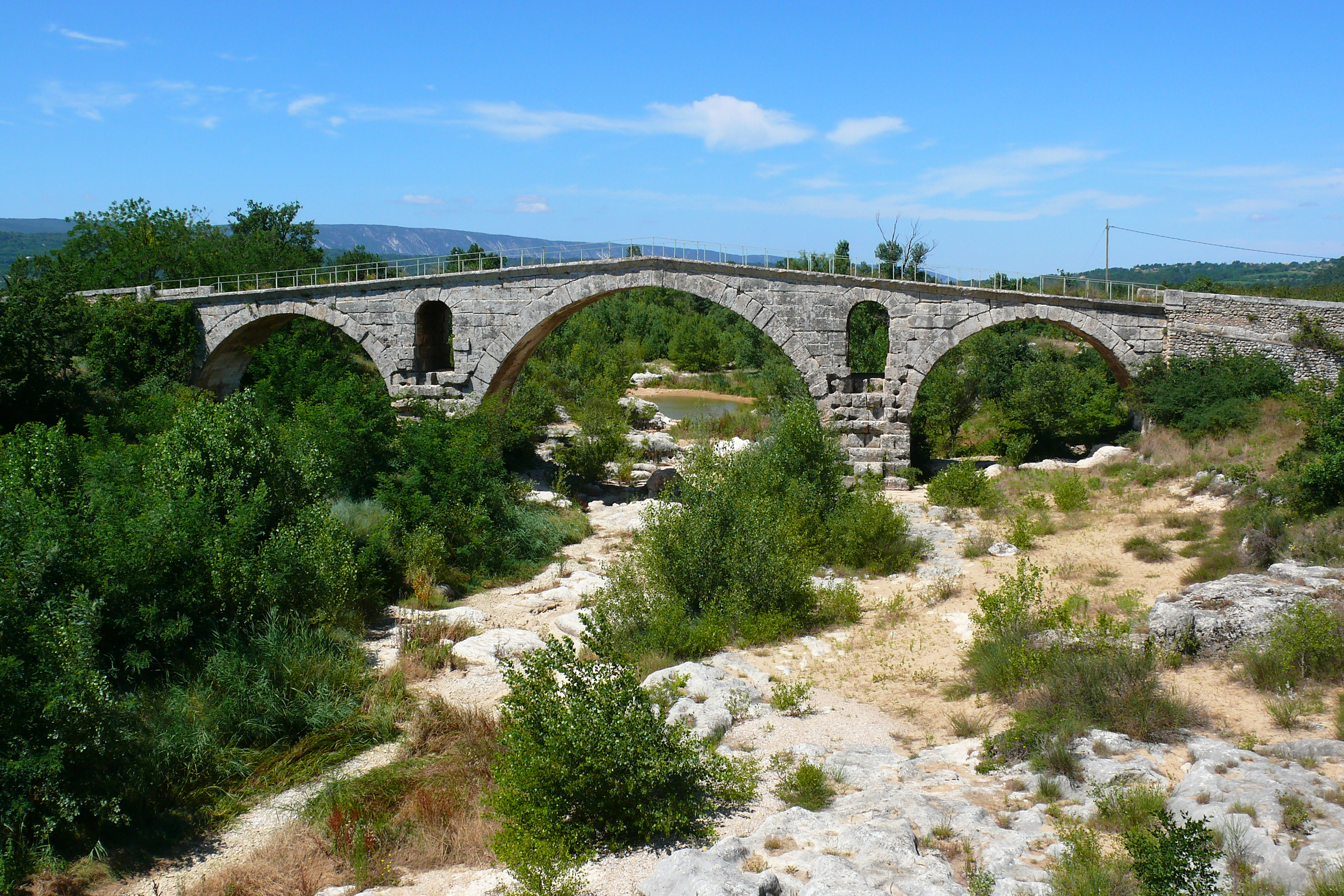
- The Calavon crossed by the Pont Julien near Bonnieux

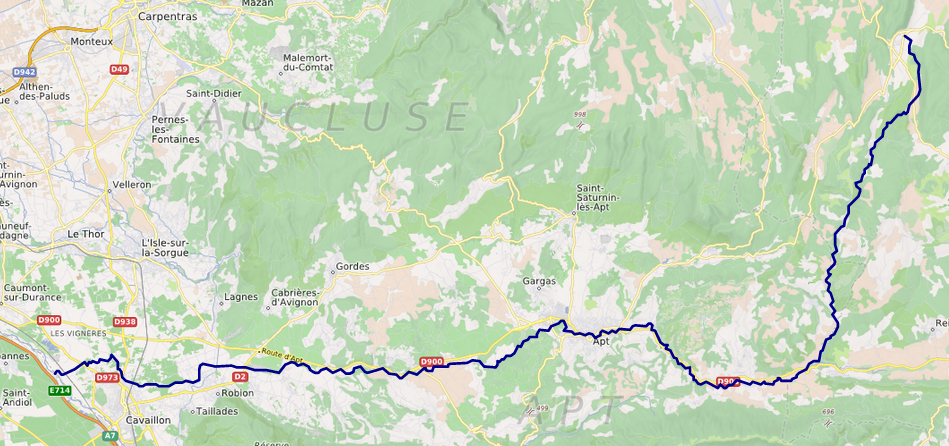

Location
- Country: France

Physical characteristics
- Source
  - location: Banon
  - coordinates: 44°02′10″N 05°38′32″E
  - elevation: 420 m (1,380 ft)
- Mouth
  - location: Durance
  - coordinates: 43°51′19″N 04°59′16″E
  - elevation: 57 m (187 ft)
- Length: 86.7 km (53.9 mi)
- Basin size: 1,027 km^{2} (397 sq mi)
- Discharge
  - average: 0.89 m^{3}/s (31 cu ft/s)

Basin features
- Progression: Durance→ Rhône→ Mediterranean Sea
- Tributaries
  - right: Dôa

The Calavon (French pronunciation: [kalavɔ̃]; also called le Coulon) is an 86.7-kilometre (53.9 mi) long river in the Alpes-de-Haute-Provence and Vaucluse départements, southeastern France. Its drainage basin is 1,027 km^{2} (397 sq mi). Its source is near Banon. It flows generally west-southwest. It is a right tributary of the Durance into which it flows at Caumont-sur-Durance, near Cavaillon.

== Départements and communes along its course ==
This list is ordered from source to mouth:

- Alpes-de-Haute-Provence: Banon, Simiane-la-Rotonde, Oppedette,
- Vaucluse: Viens
- Alpes-de-Haute-Provence: Céreste-en-Luberon
- Vaucluse: Saint-Martin-de-Castillon, Castellet, Saignon, Caseneuve, Apt, Bonnieux, Roussillon, Goult, Ménerbes, Beaumettes, Oppède, Maubec, Robion, Cavaillon, Caumont-sur-Durance
