= Château d'Autet =

Château located in the Luberon

Coordinates: 43°55′52″N 5°33′2″E

Château d'Autet is a château located in the Luberon hills of the commune of Viens in the Vaucluse department, Provence-Alpes-Côte d'Azur, France. The château lies approximately 3 kilometres (1.9 mi) to the northeast of the village of Gignac, and roughly 85 kilometres (53 mi) north of Marseille.

== History ==
Built in the 19th century as a hunting lodge, the dilapidated house and surrounding neglected estate were bought in 1998 by David Armstrong-Jones, 2nd Earl of Snowdon, who is reported to have paid £500,000. In addition to repairing the house, the Earl planted fields of lavender on the estate nearby.
