= Banon, Alpes-de-Haute-Provence =

Banon
- Commune
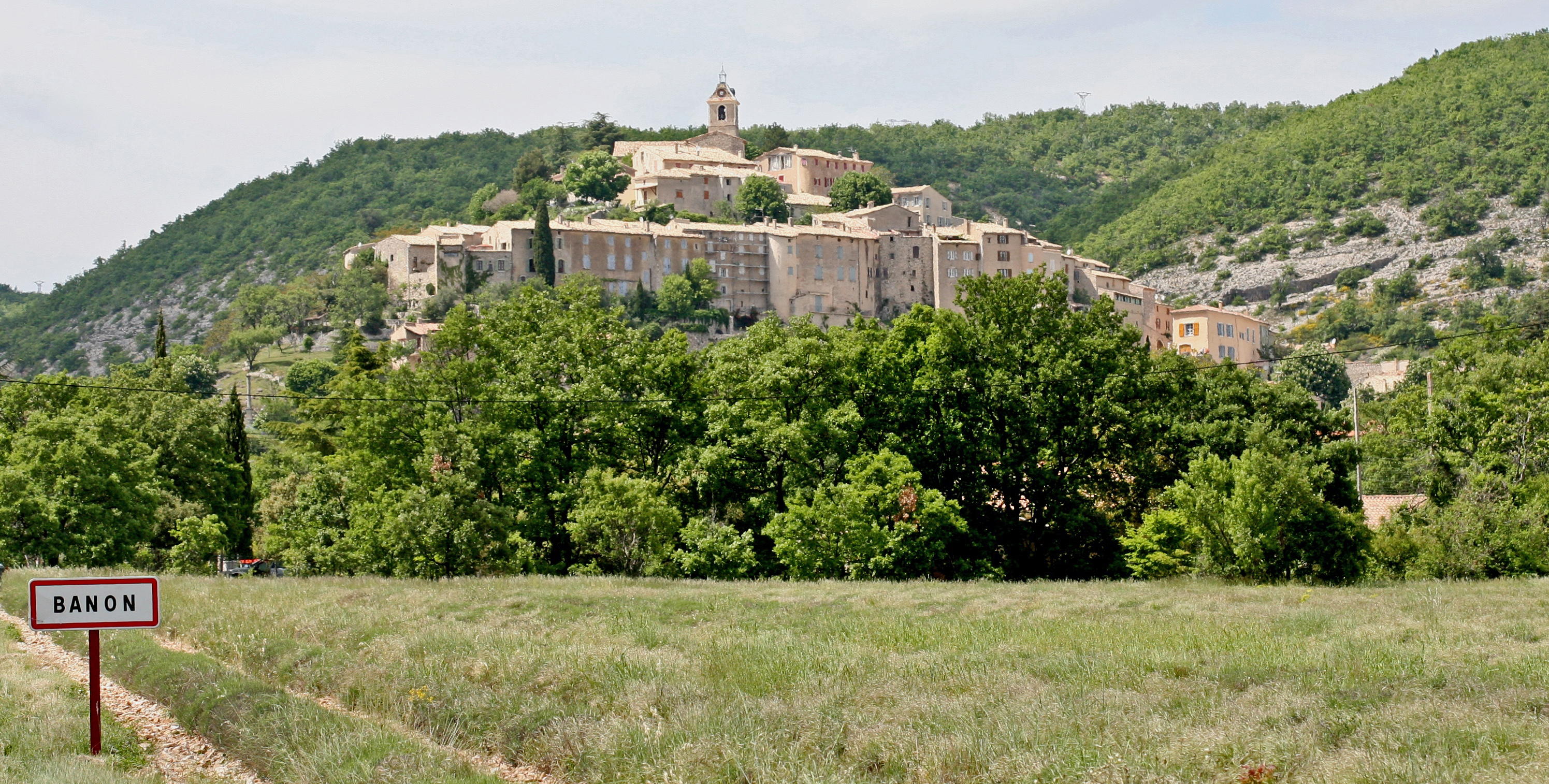
- The village of Banon

- Coat of arms
- Location of Banon
- Location within France Location within Provence-Alpes-Côte d'Azur
- Coordinates: 44°02′20″N 5°37′43″E
- Country: France
- Region: Provence-Alpes-Côte d'Azur
- Department: Alpes-de-Haute-Provence
- Arrondissement: Forcalquier
- Canton: Reillanne
- Intercommunality: Haute-Provence Pays de Banon

Government
  - Mayor (2026–32): Sylvain Ricci
- Area^{1}: 39.81 km^{2} (15.37 sq mi)
- Elevation: 760 m (2,490 ft)
- Highest elevation: 1,093 m (3,586 ft)
- Lowest elevation: 540 m (1,770 ft)
- Population (2023): 1,072
  - Density: 26.93/km^{2} (69.74/sq mi)
- Time zone: UTC+01:00 (CET)
  - Summer (DST): UTC+02:00 (CEST)
- INSEE/Postal code: 04018 /04150
- ^{1} French Land Register data, which excludes lakes, ponds, glaciers > 1 km^{2} (0.386 sq mi or 247 acres) and river estuaries.

Banon (French pronunciation: [banɔ̃]) is a commune in the department of Alpes-de-Haute-Provence in the Provence-Alpes-Côte d'Azur region of south-eastern France.

== Geography ==
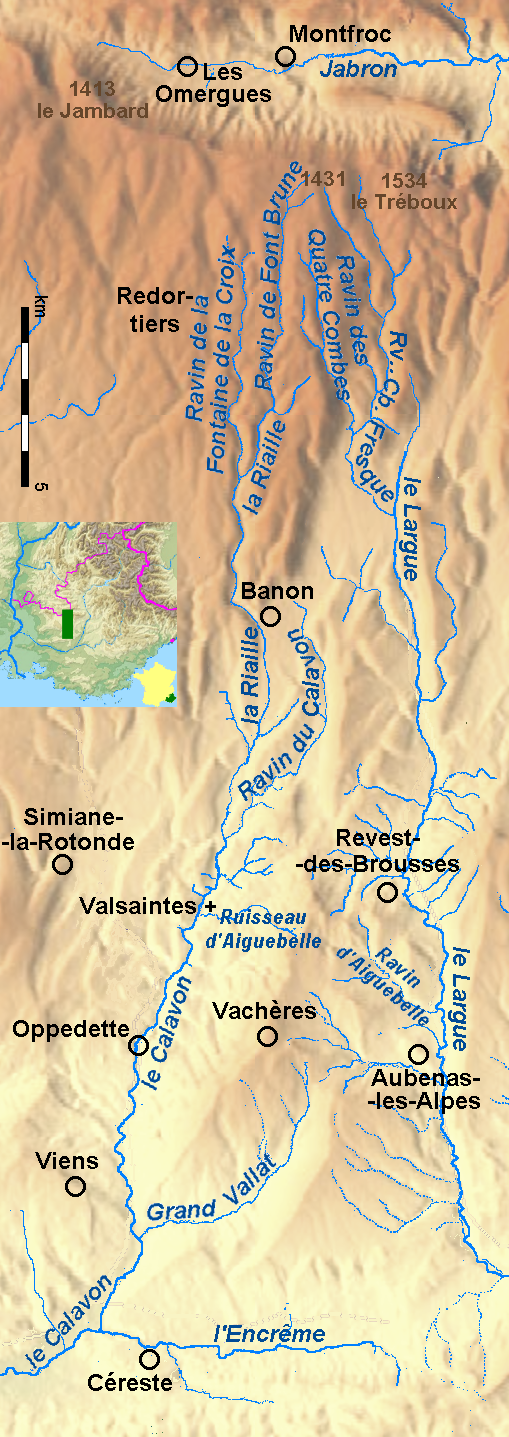
Banon between the source of river Calavon in the east and its longer top affluent Riaille in the west

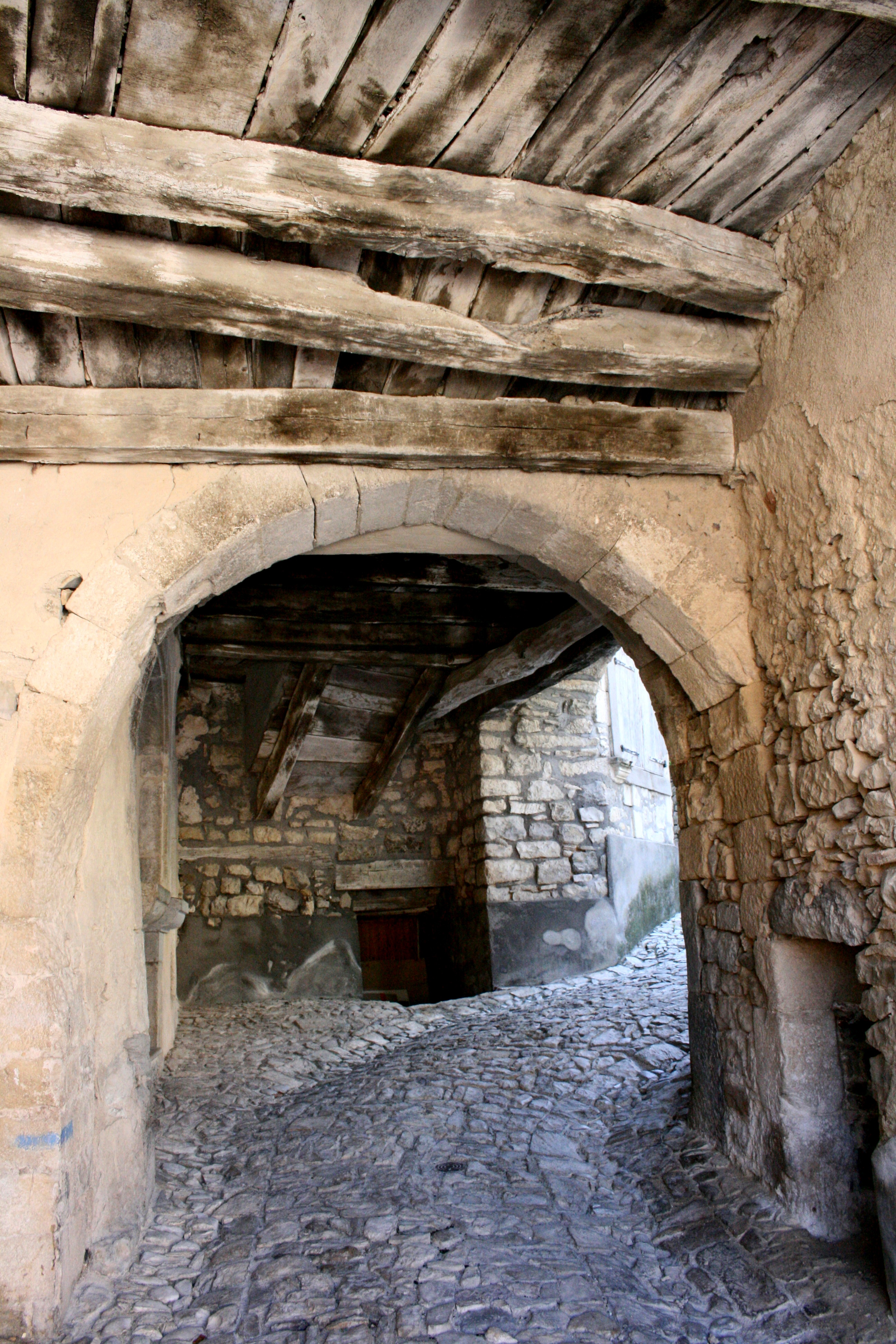
Access to the Rue des Arcades

Banon is located next to the Plateau of Albion some 15 km north-west of Forcalquier, 50 km east of Carpentras, and 760 m above sea level. The village is on a hill overlooking the Coulon valley. Access to the commune is by the D950 road from Revest-du-Bion in the north-west which passes through the village and continues south-east to Limans. The D51 goes south-west from the village to Simiane-la-Rotonde. The D5 goes south-east to Revest-des-Brousses. The D12 goes north from the D950 and loops around to join the D950 again east of the commune. Apart from the village there are the hamlets of L'Adret, L'Adrech, and Le Serre. The commune is farmland on the lower areas to the west and forested on the heights in the east.

=== Geology ===
Limestone, dating from the Cretaceous period, is the predominant rock in the commune although in the Riaille valley it is Barremian limestone. The limestone is used for construction, especially for wall ties, framing, and lower walls, as well as for fountains. Depressions, oriented SSW-NNE and NNW-SSE are formed of marl and sandstone from the Upper Cretaceous period. Limestones and porous rocks allow water to infiltrate down to a substrate of Neocomian marl. These infiltrations scour the rocks causing the formation of sinkholes or Avens (Pitches) such as the Aven of Belette. The waters circulate at a speed of 77 metres/hour.

=== Relief ===
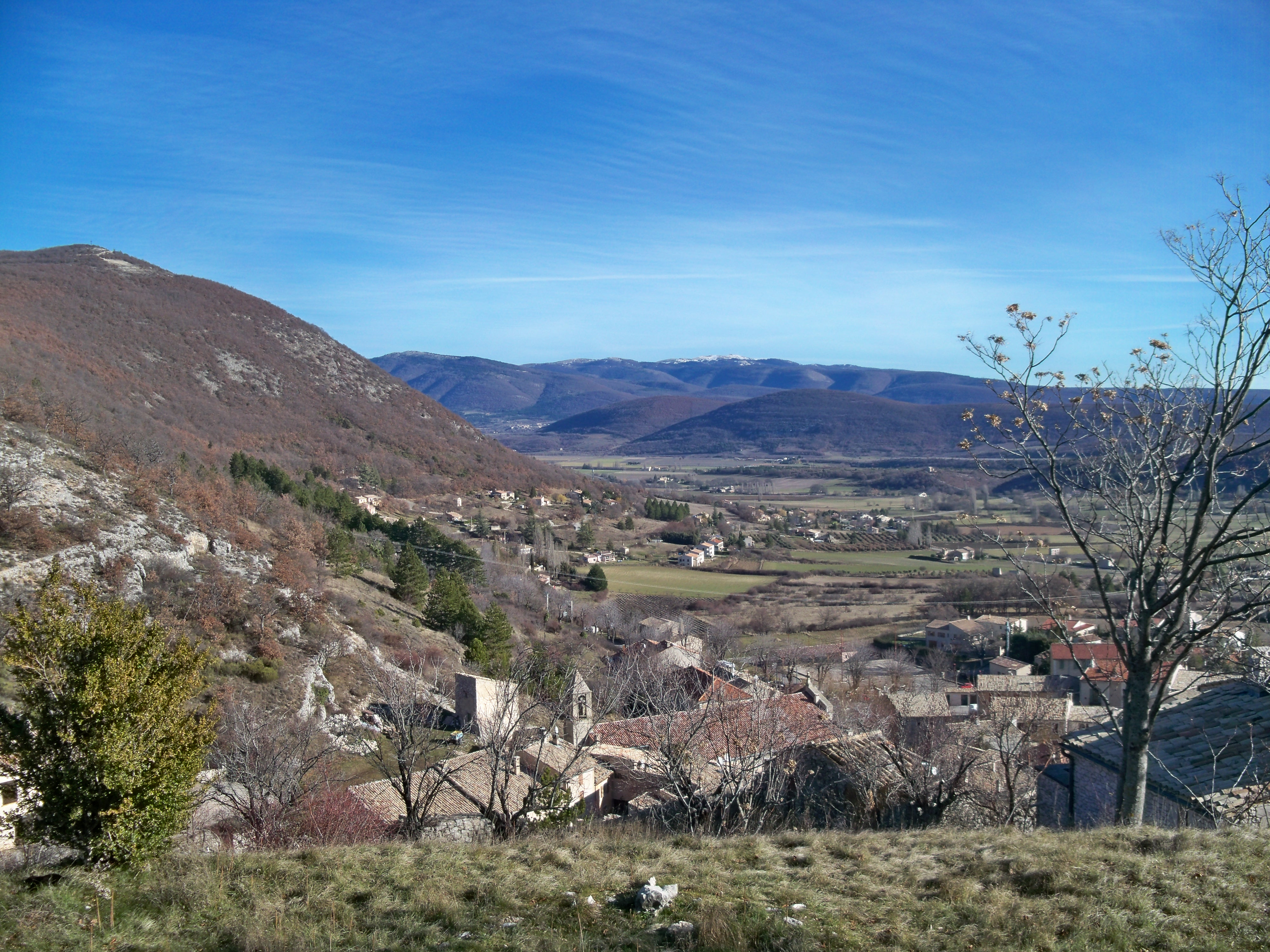
The Valley from the Banon heights

Summits

- The Croue de Bane or Grou de Banc (1092 m)
- The Crête de Gamby (Gamby peak) (883 m)

=== Hydrography ===
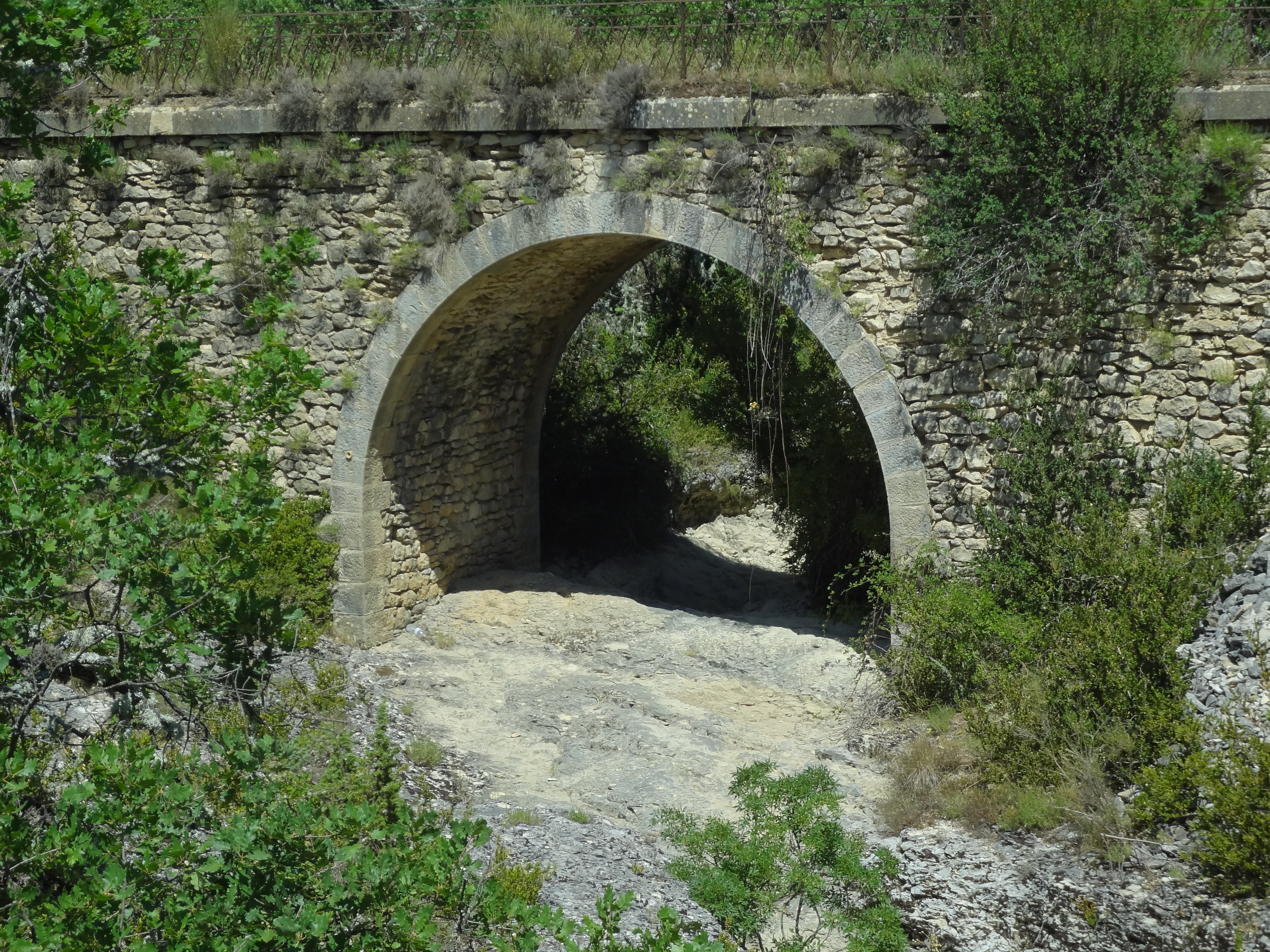
A bridge over the Largue

The Ravin du Calavon rises just east of the village and flows south, becoming the Calavon river (also known as the Coulon), which eventually joins the Durance south-east of Cabannes. The Riaille river flows south through the western side of the commune and the village before joining the Calavon south of the commune. The Largue flows from the north down the eastern side of the commune and continues south to join the Durance east of Manosque.

=== Environment ===
The commune has 2,271 hectares of woods and forests.

=== Climate ===
Banon is located in Alpes-de-Haute-Provence and enjoys an interior Mediterranean climate with summers hot and dry but the winters are cool and marked by frequent frosts. The annual average temperature is 12.8 °C with an average maximum of 22.4 °C and an average minimum of 0 °C. The highest maximum and minimum temperatures are 30 °C in July and 0 °C in December and January. Average sunshine hours are 2,755 hours per year with a peak of 343 hours in July. Another important characteristic of the Mediterranean climate is the rainfall which totals 426 millimetres over the year, unevenly distributed with a little more than 21 millimetres in July and more than 54 millimetres in October. The mistral blows sometimes although the town is sheltered by the Lure mountain. It may be more exposed to the Levant or the Sirocco which rarely occur.

The nearest weather station to Banon is in Saint-Christol in Vaucluse, a little farther away than Forcalquier.

=== Natural and technological risks ===
None of the 200 communes in the department are in a no seismic risk zone. Banon is in zone 1a (very low risk but not negligible) according to the deterministic classification of 1991 based on the historical earthquakes, and zone 3 (moderate risk) according to the EC8 probabilistic classification of 2011. Banon is also exposed to three other natural hazards:

- forest fire,
- flood,
- landslide.

Banon is not exposed to any risk of technological origin identified by the Prefecture.

There is no risk prevention plan for foreseeable natural risks (PPR) for the commune and there is no DICRIM.

=== Transport network ===
Several bus lines connect Banon to other communes in the region. The places served are: Apt, Forcalquier, Digne-les-Bains, Avignon, and Manosque. There is also a bus service on market days (Tuesdays) to neighbouring communes.

The nearest airport and railway station are at Avignon.

== Toponymy ==
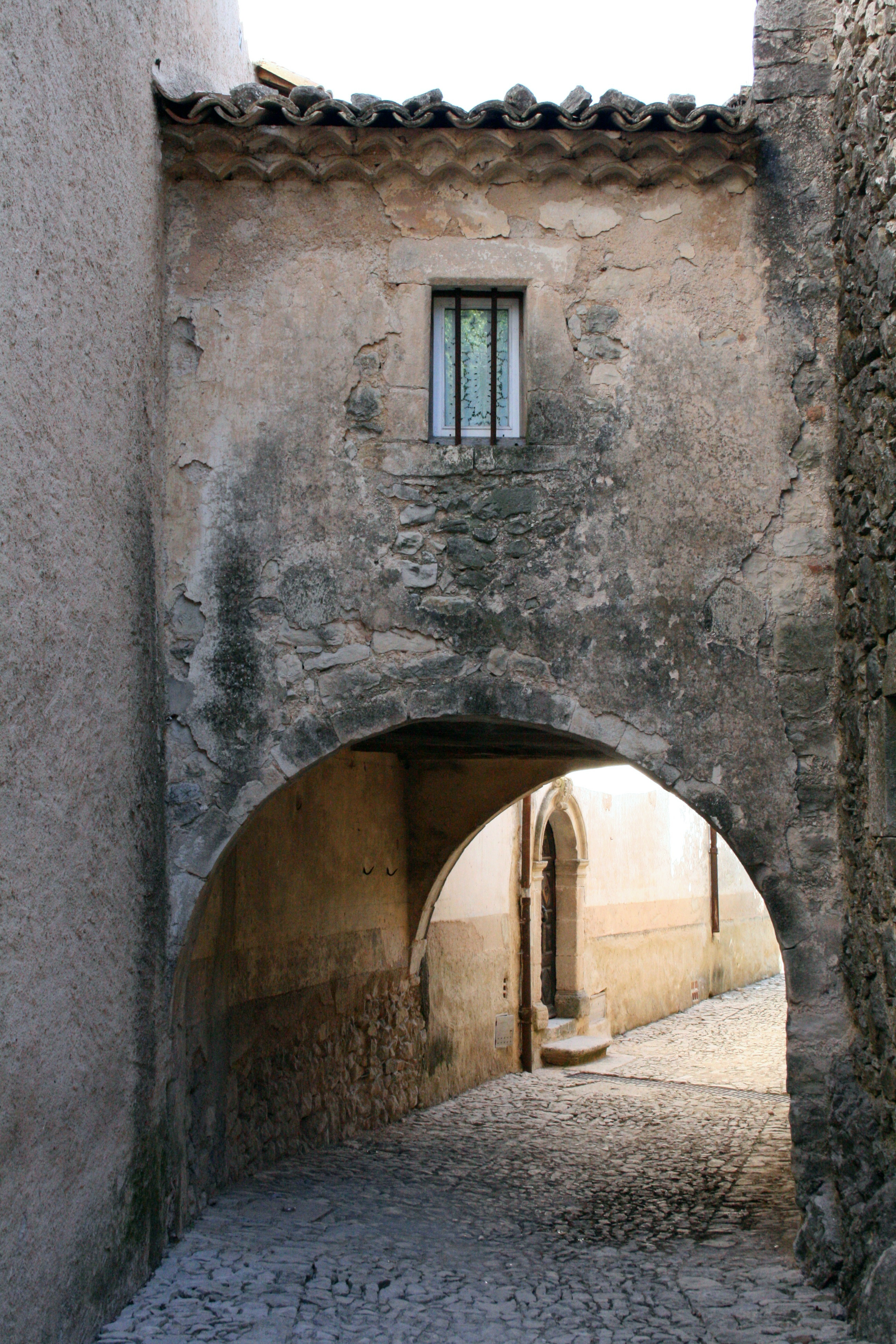
The old town

The area appears for the first time in texts from the 11th century (castrum Banonni). According to Charles Rostaing the name is formed from the oronymic root Ban meaning "horn" or "point". According to this author the name predates the Gauls. This explanation is also shared by Fénié and Claude Martel, for whom this explanation also applies to Grou de Bane. According to Ernest Nègre, Banon comes from a Germanic proper name Bano.

Banon in Vivaro-Alpine dialect and in Provençal dialect is said and written Banon in the classical norm and Banoun in the Mistralian norm.

Three main factors explain the toponymy of the commune: the relief between the Albion plateau and the Lure mountain, its location in the Occitan linguistic area, and the people of the area. The terrain is very present: the Pié d'Enroux is formed from a local evolution of the Latin podium meaning "height". The pey in Peymian has the same origin, the name of this hill meaning "the mountain of the middle". The name of the Puy de Salve is formed from the most current evolution in France of podium and there is also the Crête de Gamby (Gamby Ridge). The Coueste Chaude (to the west of the village) is on the slope of a mountain, Occitan derived from the French côte. Other names are formed from the words adret (sunny side of a mountain) and ubac (shady side): thus there are the Adret and the Ubac of Grou de Ban, the hamlet of Adrech at the foot of the Grou, and the Ubac farm at the foot of the Pié d'Enroux. The Combe de Vaux is a pleonastic doublet to designate a valley.

The work of hydraulic erosion on limestone has created avens (sinkholes) including at least one with a specific name: the Aven de Goutin. Amplified by deforestation, the same erosion moves large quantities of stones from the mountain slopes and deposits them on the plains, sometimes covering arable land: this is the origin of the name of Gravières south of the village.

The relatively high flat arable areas are called plains even though they are on a mountain: this name is used in Plaines (at the northern border of the commune) and in the hamlet of Plaines (in ruins) on the southern boundary (as well as these there is the toponym le Nord des Plaines). Le Plan is also a small plain.

Water is also present in the toponymy: there is the water source called Font des Petits and a marshy area called La Palud. A valley is named Aiguebelle meaning "beautiful water". The reference to water is rare in the toponymy of this dry region.

The term grange (barn) in this area refers to an isolated farm: this toponym is present in La Grange (at the northern border of the commune), also at La Grange (outside the village), and in Les Granges de Dauban. The hill overlooking the village is called Le Défens: this is an area, owned by the lord or the community, where herds were banned. Le Clos de Gardon is a cultivable area where the material from road ballasting was used to enclose the fields and meadows with a dry stone wall. Les Chastellas was a fortification at high altitude (which has been confirmed by excavations, see below) and La Tuilerie was a tile production workshop prior to the 18th century (before the term tuilière was used).

== History ==
=== Prehistory and Antiquity ===
The commune had inhabitants in prehistoric times: the discoveries of Paleolithic remains are quite numerous.

There are two oppida at Mures and Chastellard. At Font-Crémat, a Gallo-Roman villa and a necropolis have been discovered. A treasure of 700 denarii from Nero to Geta was discovered in a vase in 1909 as well as many other unrelated discoveries. During the Pax Romana the iron manufacturing workshops became established in the commune territory. Throughout this period the territory of Banon was part of that of the Sogiontiques (Sogionti) whose territory spanned south of the Baronnies of the Durance. The Sogiontiques were federated to the Vocontii and, after the Gallic Wars, they were attached with them to the Roman province of Gallia Narbonensis (now Narbonne). In the 2nd century they were detached from Voconces and formed a distinct civitas with Segustero (Sisteron) as its capital.

Romanisation can be seen in places such as the villas of Fouent-Crema: there were several houses and workshops or a Gallo-Roman hamlet settled on the plains north-east of Banon in the 1st and 2nd centuries AD. At the time of the Roman Crisis of the Third Century the whole area was burned (about 240-275). The people did not desert the commune as the site was occupied again in the 4th century before abandonment at the end of that century at the same time as the Chastelard de Lardiers nearby. The area then became a necropolis and the location of the inhabitants for this period has not been determined either in the immediate vicinity or on the heights.

While the south-east of Gaul was Burgundian land, the king of the Ostrogoths, Theodoric the Great, conquered the region between the Durance and the Rhône as well as Isère in 510. The commune depended briefly on Italy until 526. In order to reconcile with the Burgundian king Godomar III, the Ostrogoth Regent Amalasuntha gave him the territory.

=== Middle Ages ===
While Chastelard was abandoned, there remained a visual (in the landscape) and symbolic (in attitudes) cue in that the border with the neighbouring community of Lardiers was fixed along the side of the oppidum in a process that seemed common.

The village was fortified in the 11th century (it was the castrum banonum in the charters of the time). During the Middle Ages the Church of Our Lady depended on the Abbey of Cruis who received the income attached to this church as well as those of the Chapel of Saint-Hilaire (disappeared) and returned it to Sénanque Abbey.

The fief of Simiane (from the 12th century to the 1789 revolution) was devastated by Raimond de Turenne in 1391. The Banon community was then within the viguerie of Forcalquier.

=== Modern times ===
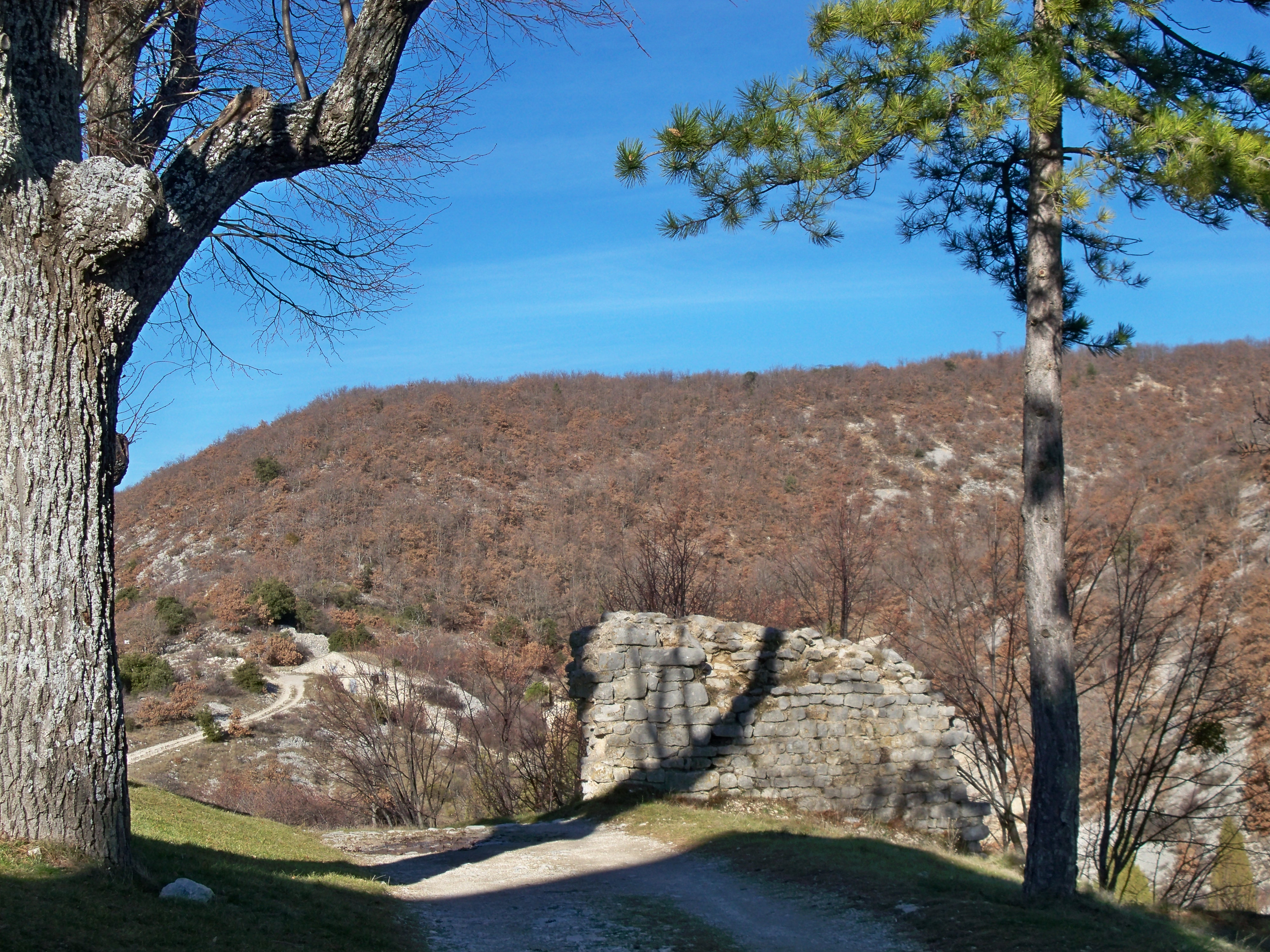
The old town rampart

A fair was held at Banon until the 18th century.

There was a windmill in Banon (probably after the 17th century). Its ruins are located near the Clos de Gardon.

=== French Revolution ===
During the French Revolution the commune had a patriotic society which was founded after the end of 1792. The medieval castle was razed during the Revolution.

=== Contemporary Era ===
The French coup d'état of 1851 committed by Louis-Napoléon Bonaparte against the French Second Republic provoked an armed uprising in the lower Alps in defence of the Constitution. After the failure of the insurrection severe repression continued against those who defended the Republic: 17 inhabitants of Banon were brought before the Joint Committee and the majority were sentenced to exile in Algeria.

As with many communes in the department, Banon adopted schools well before the Jules Ferry laws. The scattered settlements led to doubling of the facilities with, in 1863, two schools installed in the main town and the village of Largue at the east and west extremities of the commune. These schools provided primary education for boys and girls: the Falloux Laws (1851) required the opening of a girls' school in communes with more than 800 inhabitants. The commune benefited from grants from the second Duruy Law (1877) to rebuild the Largue village school and to build a new one at Granges de Dauban.

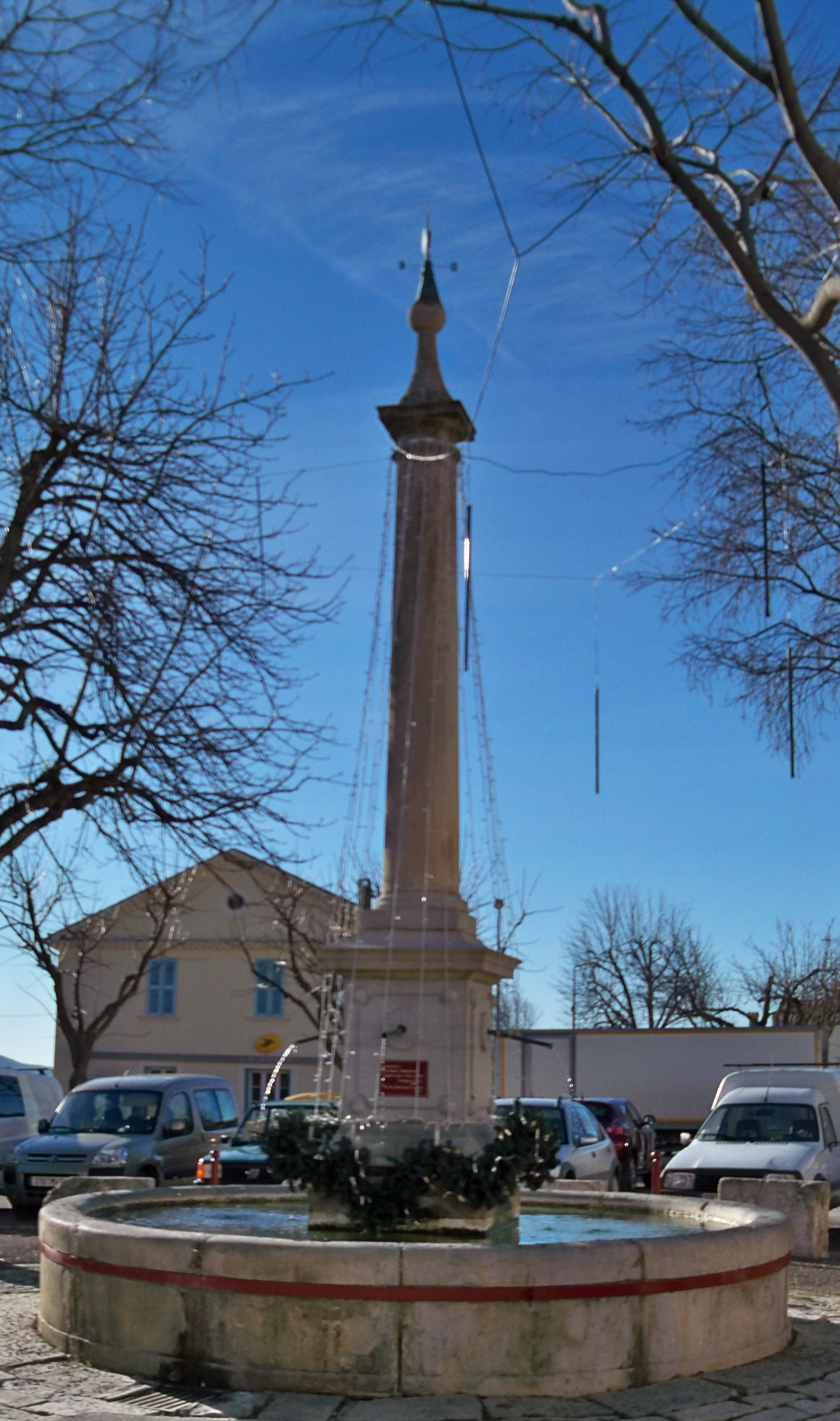
The fountain

The village people started moving in the 19th century: people began to abandon the tight housing on the heights to build their houses near the crossroads of the roads to Sisteron, Apt, Manosque and Forcalquier in about 1840–1880. This new community was called La Bourgade. The old village was not abandoned immediately as the church was enlarged and a hospital was built on the heights. In 1887, however, a college was built in the new village on the Market Square (Place du Marché). In 1905 a water jet fountain sourced from the Brieux and fed by an underground aqueduct 3 km long was built in the new village. Thereafter all new buildings, private or public, were built in the lower village (a church in 1911, a hospital in 1930) and, in 1950, the Orchards began to be converted to housing zones.

In the 20th century the cultivation of lavender commenced and a distillery was founded.

At the end of the Second World War the police station moved to Forcalquier.

=== Heraldry ===
Arms of Banon	Blazon: Party per fess: at first Or, a Cross of Gules; at second Gules, a cross of Or.

== Administration ==
List of Successive Mayors

From	To	Name
1896	1910	Joseph Auguste Moynier
1945		Charles Vial
1983	2001	Jacques Blanc
2001	2008	Claude Barthe
2008	2014	Cyrille Prache
2014	2020	Philippe Wagner
2020	2026	Michèle Moutte
2026	incumbent	Sylvain Ricci

=== Inter-communality ===
Banon is part of the Community of communes of Haute-Provence-Pays de Banon.

=== Budget and Taxation ===
The taxation of households and businesses in Banon in 2009
Tax	Communal part	Inter-communal part	Departmental part	Regional part
Housing Tax (TH)	7.80%	0.55%	5.53%	0.00%
Property Tax on Buildings (TFPB)	16.00%	1.32%	14.49%	2.36%
Property Tax on undeveloped land (TFPNB)	44.50%	4.18%	47.16%	8.85%
Professional Tax (TP)	9.40%*	0.94%	10.80%	3.84%

The Regional part of the Housing tax is not applicable.

The Professional Tax was replaced in 2010 by the corporate property contribution (CFE)on the rental value of property and the contribution of value added companies (CAVE) which both form the territorial economic contribution (CET), a local tax introduced by the Finance Act 2010.

== Population ==
The inhabitants of the commune are known as Banonais or Banonaises in French.

Historical population

Year	Pop.	±% p.a.
1793	1,004	—
1800	945	−0.86%
1806	1,163	+3.52%
1821	1,272	+0.60%
1831	1,337	+0.50%
1836	1,316	−0.32%
1841	1,373	+0.85%
1846	1,352	−0.31%
1851	1,307	−0.67%
1856	1,266	−0.64%
1861	1,260	−0.09%
1866	1,172	−1.44%
1872	1,163	−0.13%
1876	1,234	+1.49%
1881	1,206	−0.46%
1886	1,159	−0.79%
1891	1,083	−1.35%
1896	1,039	−0.83%
1901	1,019	−0.39%

Year	Pop.	±% p.a.
1906	1,017	−0.04%
1911	1,005	−0.24%
1921	879	−1.33%
1926	783	−2.29%
1931	746	−0.96%
1936	735	−0.30%
1946	737	+0.03%
1954	676	−1.07%
1962	664	−0.22%
1968	767	+2.43%
1975	850	+1.48%
1982	973	+1.95%
1990	940	−0.43%
1999	878	−0.76%
2007	1,077	+2.59%
2012	1,057	−0.37%
2017	970	−1.70%
2023	1,072	+1.68%

Source: EHESS and INSEE

The demographic history of Banon, after the bloodletting of the 14th and 15th centuries and a long period of growth until the beginning of the 19th century, was marked by a period of "stagnation" where the population was relatively stable at a high level. This period lasted from 1831 to 1851. The rural exodus then caused a long-term population decline. In 1954, after more than a century of decline, the town had lost over half of its population relative to its historical high in 1841. The decline, however, reversed from the 1960s with a growth of 50% in half a century.

== Economy ==
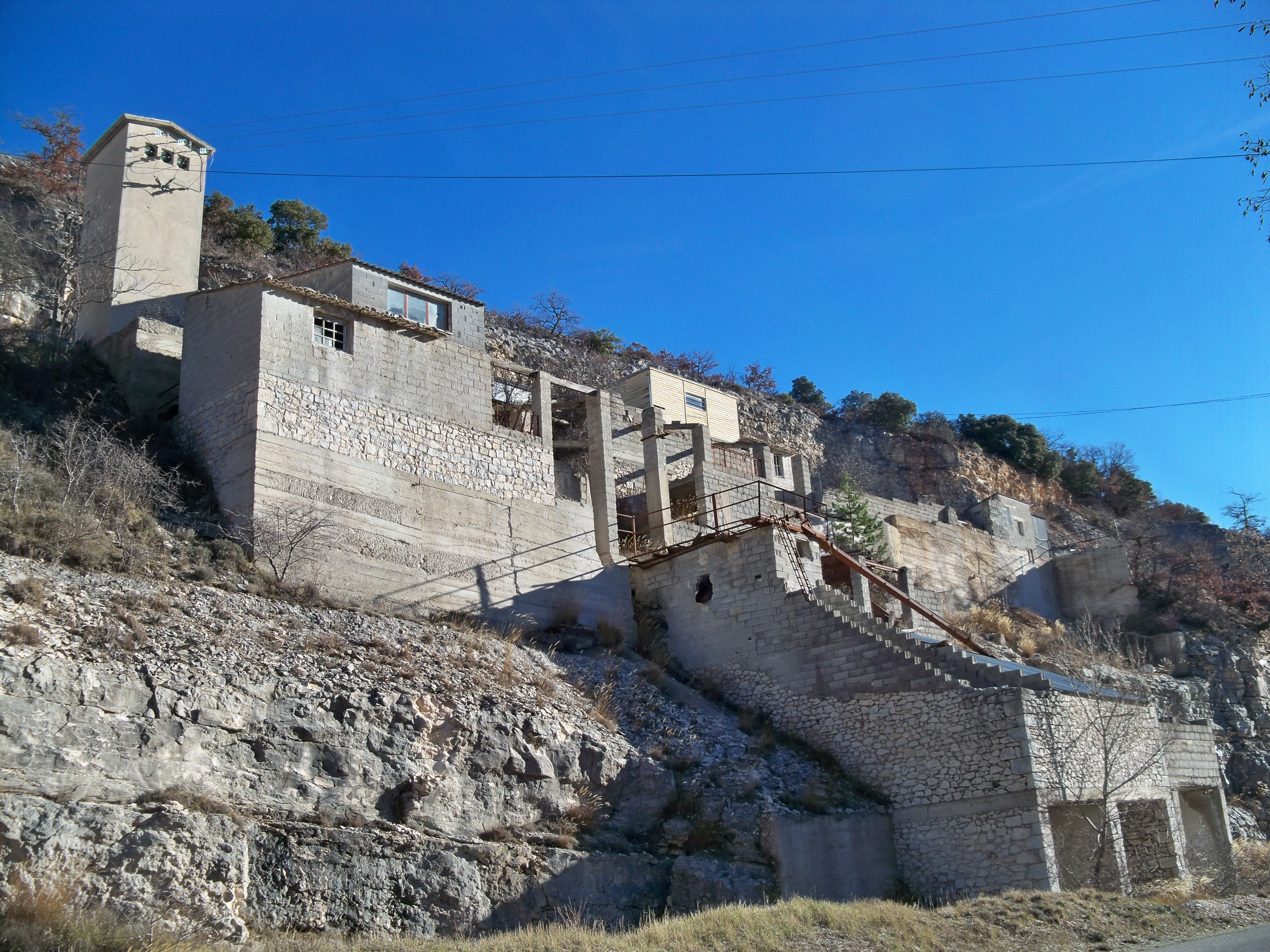
Banon Quarry

=== Overview ===
In 2017, the active population amounted to 382 people, including 47 unemployed (12%). These workers are in majority employees (72%), and are in majority employed in the commune (64%).

Agriculture is still very present with 19 active establishments at the end of 2015. There were 78 establishments in trade and services, 29 in public services (administration, education, health, social work), 16 in industry and 14 in construction. Industry and construction employ 16% of the active population, trade and services 28% and administration and public services employ 56%.

=== Agriculture ===
In late 2015 the primary sector (agriculture, forestry, fishing) had 19 establishments within the meaning of INSEE and 16 farm holdings according to the Agreste survey by the Ministry of Agriculture. This number is down significantly in the 2000s, from 27 to 16 in 10 years. From 1988 to 2000 the utilised agricultural area (UAA) has fallen sharply from 2,043 hectares to 1,207 hectares of which 1,006 hectares are crops. This area has doubled in the 2000s. In contrast, establishments practicing polyculture have disappeared. Sheep and permanent crops (various tree crops, fruit, truffles, and lavender) representing the remaining enterprises.

Vineyards, a component of the Mediterranean triad, was formerly present in Banon. In the 19th century there were several dozen hectares of vineyards producing wine for home consumption and sale in local markets with a small amount sold on the regional market. Currently the surface area of vineyards is insignificant.

=== Industry ===
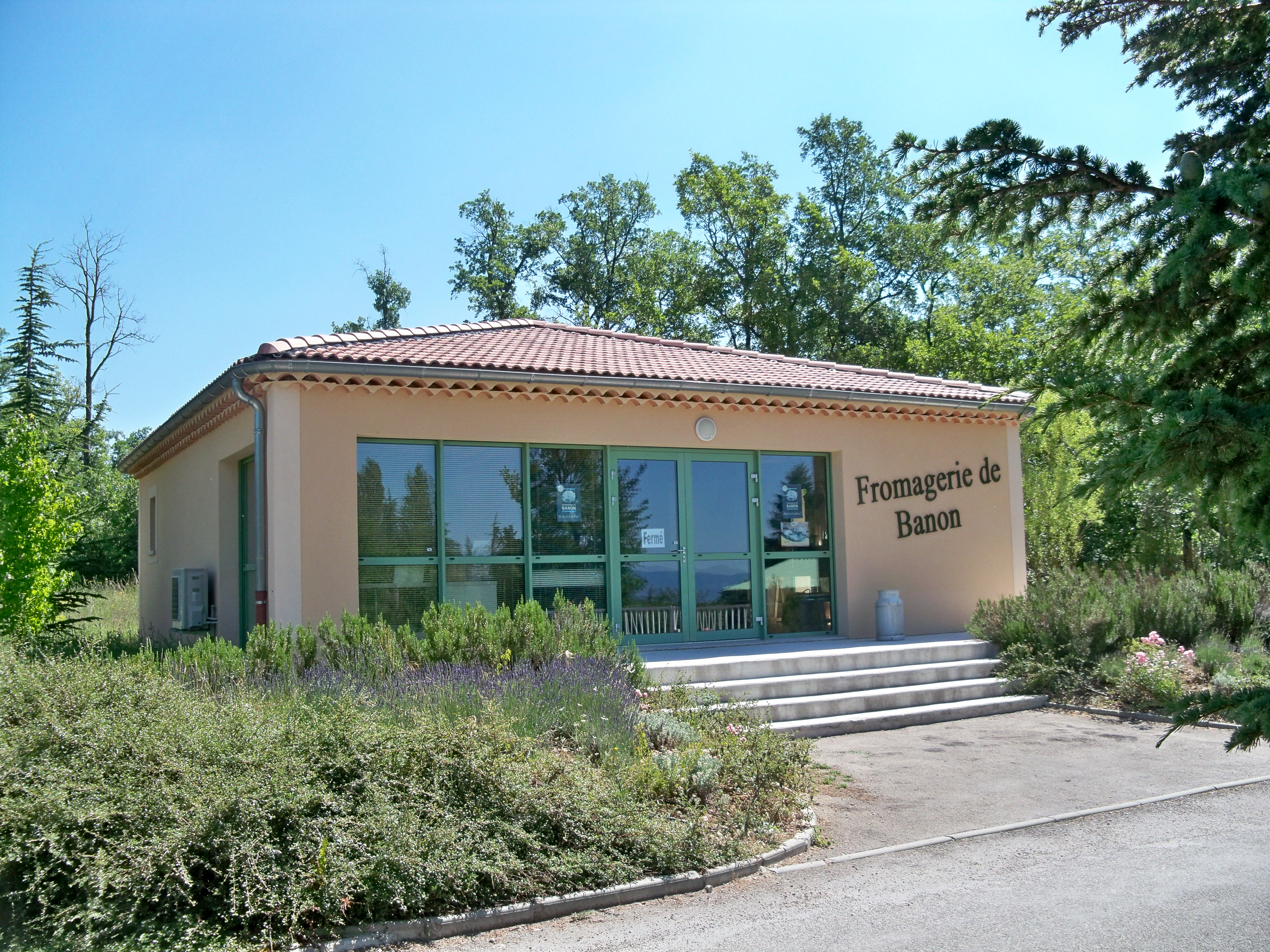
The Cheese factory

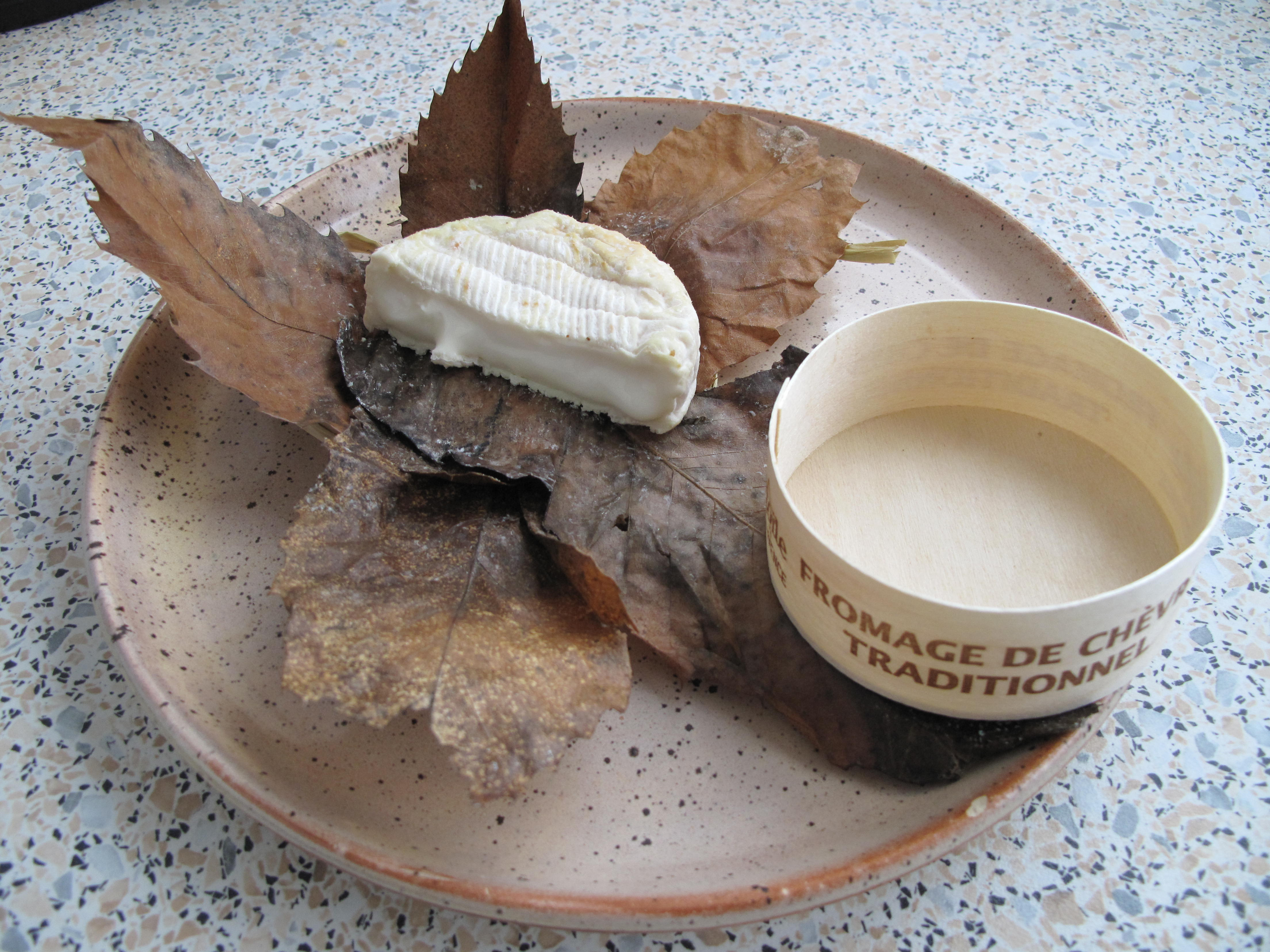
Banon cheese showing the chestnut leaf wrapping

Banon has become famous for its small goat cheeses wrapped in dry chestnut leaves and tied with raffia strings.

The Banon cheese factory employs 38 people. Over 600,000 individual cheeses are produced each year. Banon cheese is the only appellation d'origine contrôlée (AOC) in the Provence-Alpes-Côte d'Azur region.

The phosphate mines are closed but the quarry is exploited by Carrières de Haute-Provence (Haute-Provence Quarries) who still process the local limestone into aggregate.

=== Service activities ===
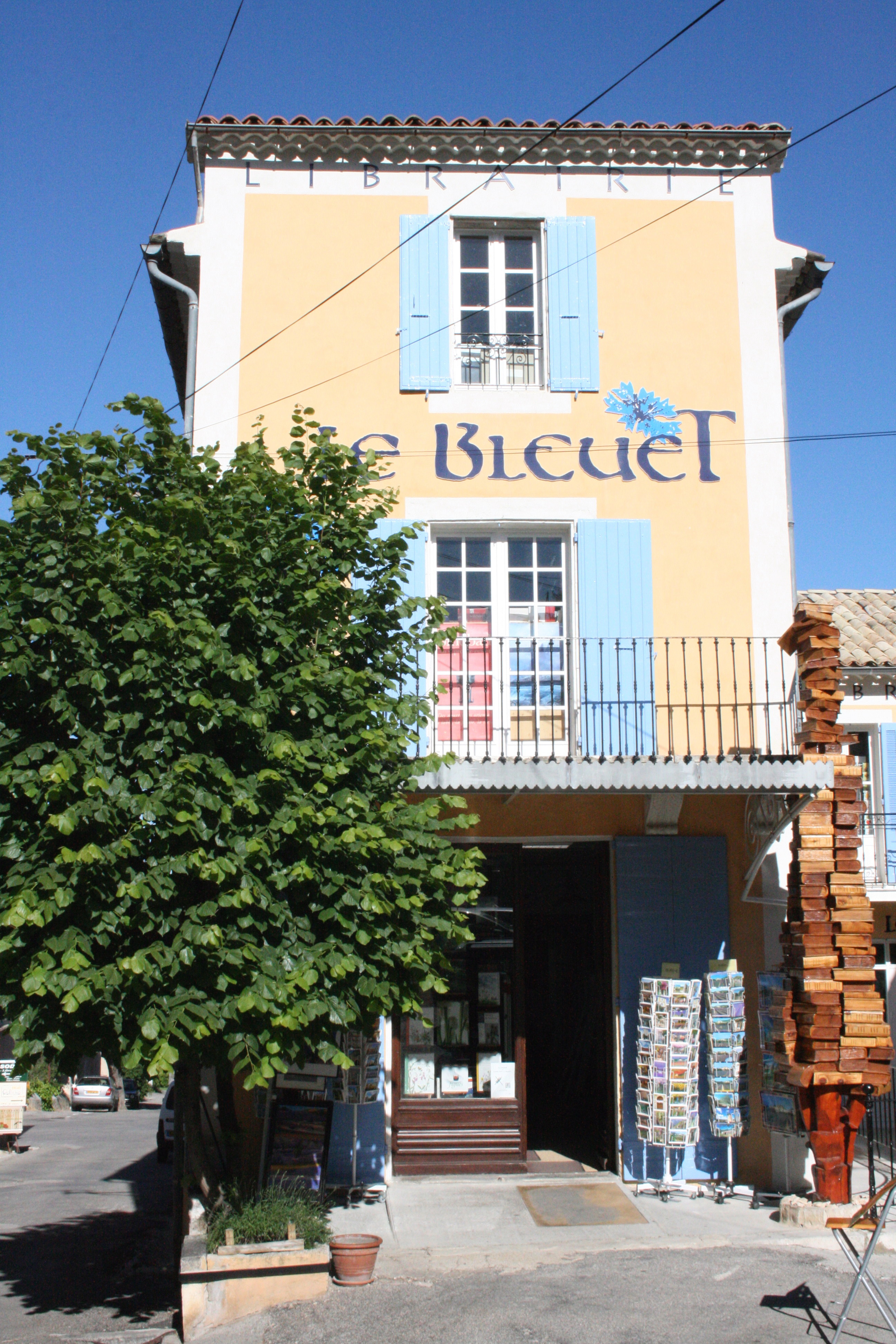
Le Bleuet bookshop at Banon

The village is notable for one of the largest independent bookstores in France, Le Bleuet, which offers more than 100,000 titles on their shelves.

According to the Departmental Observatory of tourism, the tourism function is important for the town with between 1 and 5 tourists per inhabitant visiting the commune each year. Most of the accommodation capacity is non-market (e.g. 2nd homes). The proximity of the Luberon Natural Regional Park energizes this sector of activity in the commune. Although not having any hotels, the commune still has several accommodation facilities for tourists:

- a farm campsite and a three-star rated camping area with 93 sites;
- many furnished houses

There is also a significant capacity of 185 second homes

A wide variety of shops is present in the commune:

- an insurance office
- a real estate agency
- several garages and auto shops (which employ 25 people)
- 2 banks
- various restaurants, bars, and cafes
- various grocery shops
- several bookshops and newsagents including Le Bleuet, one of the largest in France
- a jewellery shop
- a florist

== Facilities ==
=== Education ===
The commune has two educational facilities:

- a Primary school
- The Pays de Banon college

=== Sports ===
Many sports clubs are present in the commune for various sports including boxing, badminton, handball, judo, paragliding, hiking, and horse riding.

=== Health ===
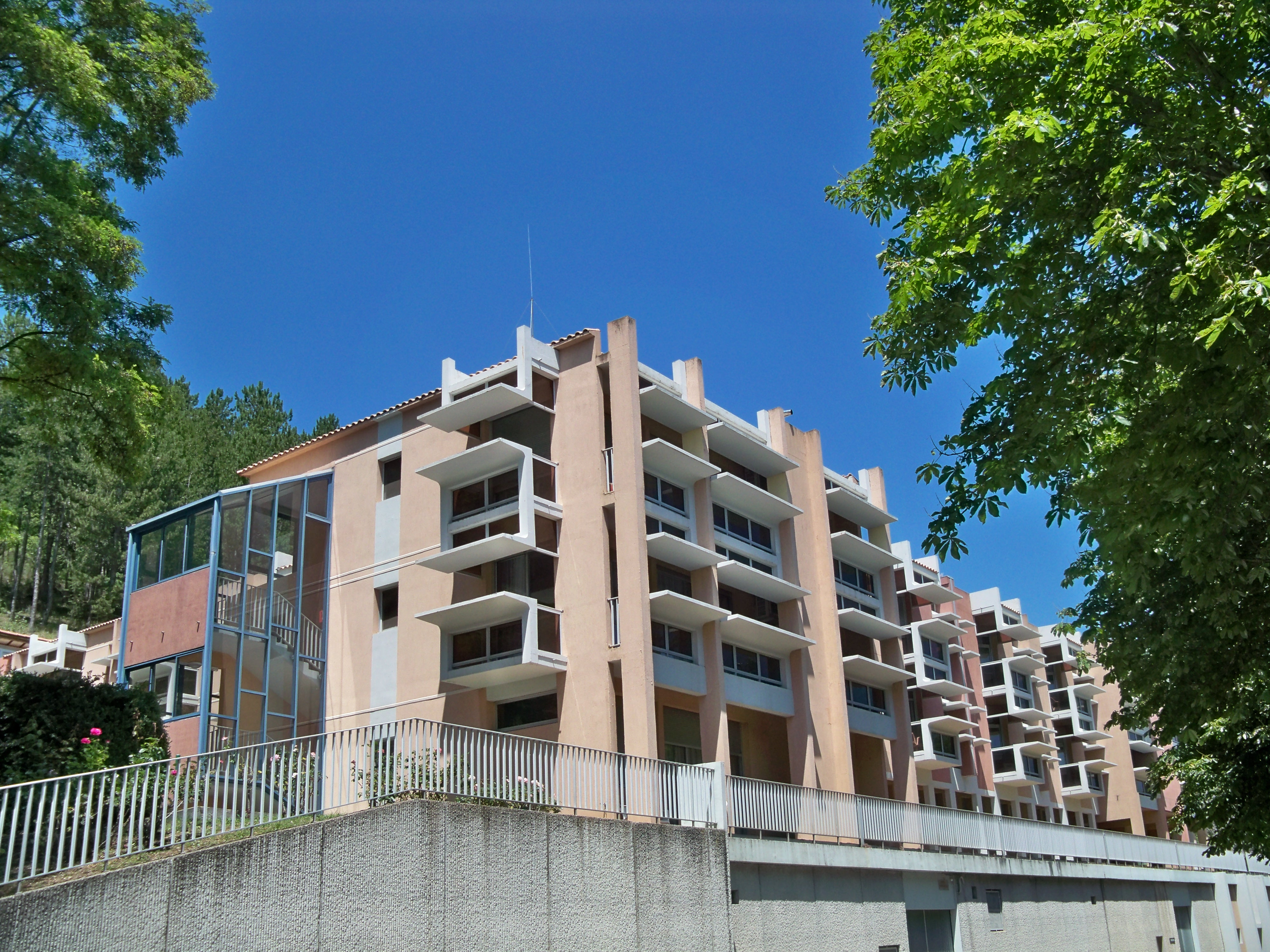
Banon Hospital

There are many health practitioners in Banon: 3 physiotherapists, 4 doctors, 2 osteopaths, and a pharmacy.

Banon has a rural hospital with 68 beds which was built between 1984 and 1985. This hospital has an after-care service and 20 undifferentiated rehabilitation beds, 48 nursing home beds and 25 Nursing Service At Home (SSIAD) places. The building stands on the site of a former hospital built by donors belonging to old local families. It is served by 60 caregivers and administrative staff and is the largest employer in the commune.

=== Communal services ===
Several public services are available:

- A CPAM Primary Health Insurance office
- A Social Action Centre
- A Public Revenue Office
- A Leisure Centre
- A Fire Station

=== Worship ===
The commune is part of the Montagne de Lure parish sector and Catholic worship is celebrated alternately in each of the churches in the sector.

== Culture and heritage ==
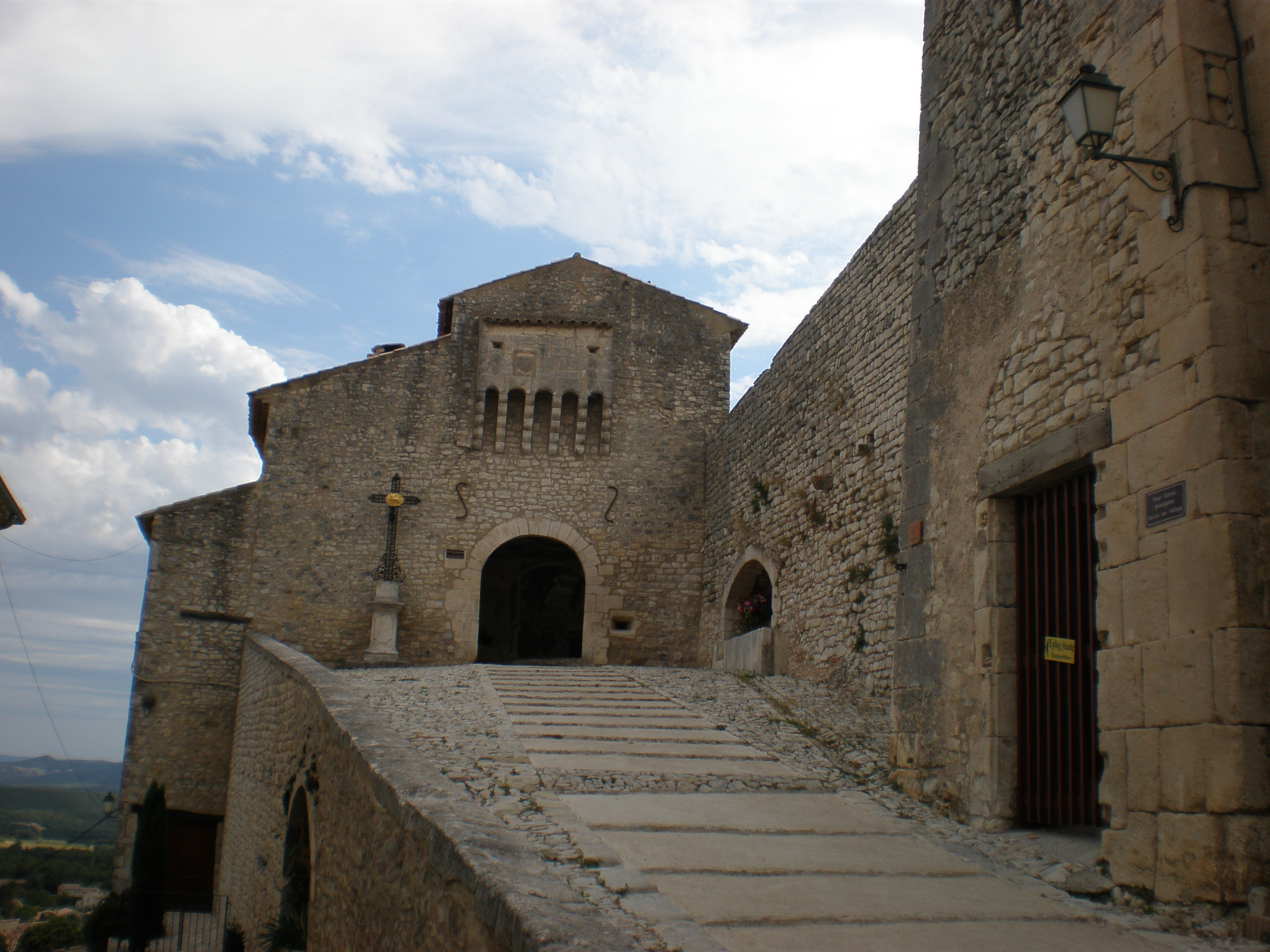
The Feudal Gatehouse

=== Civil heritage ===
- An old Feudal Gatehouse (1600) is registered as an historical monument. to a walled enclosure from the 15th century remains in part, including the portal from the 14th century defended by a Bretèche above the gateway. Some remains of the foundations and tower sections also remain.
- An old Hospital in the old village is of an archaic architecture and dates to 1850. It has been restored with arcaded streets lined with houses from the 16th century, some of which include wooden architectural elements. Some of the old houses have stone fronts in medieval style but dating from the 17th and 18th centuries. At the top of the village is a house under which the street passes has a large fireplace with a mantle decorated with gypsum from the early 17th century with a frieze including two lions in repose.
- The Gouffre du Caladaire (Caladaire Abyss) near the village.
- One of two Dovecotes that remain is the property of the commune.
- Two old Windmill towers are preserved at Vieux Montsalier and at the Notre Dame farm.
- A Brick Factory Chimney which is rare in the department is located at Banon.

=== Religious heritage ===
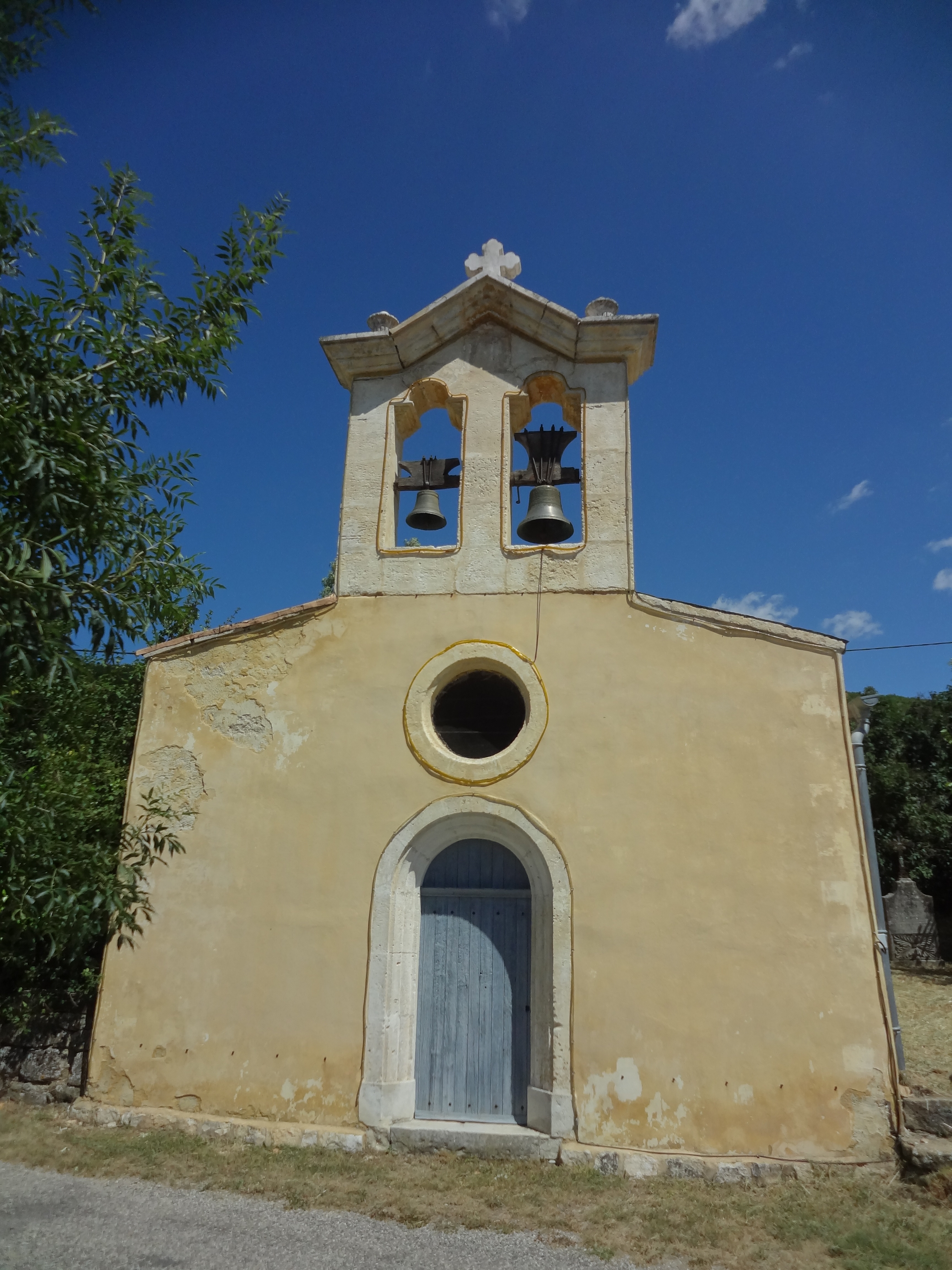
The Chapel of Saint Mark

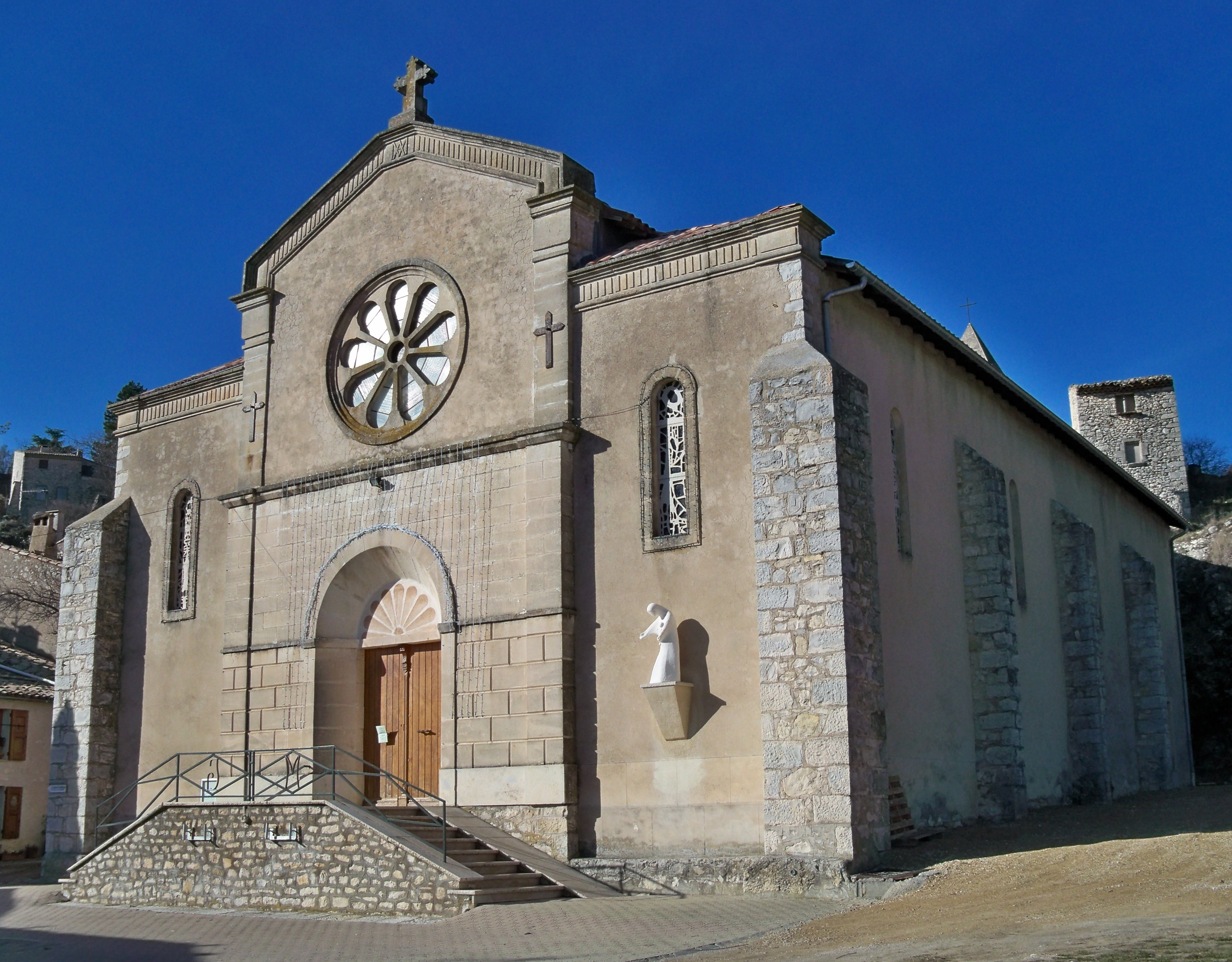
The Church of Saint-Just-et-Notre-Dame-des-Anges

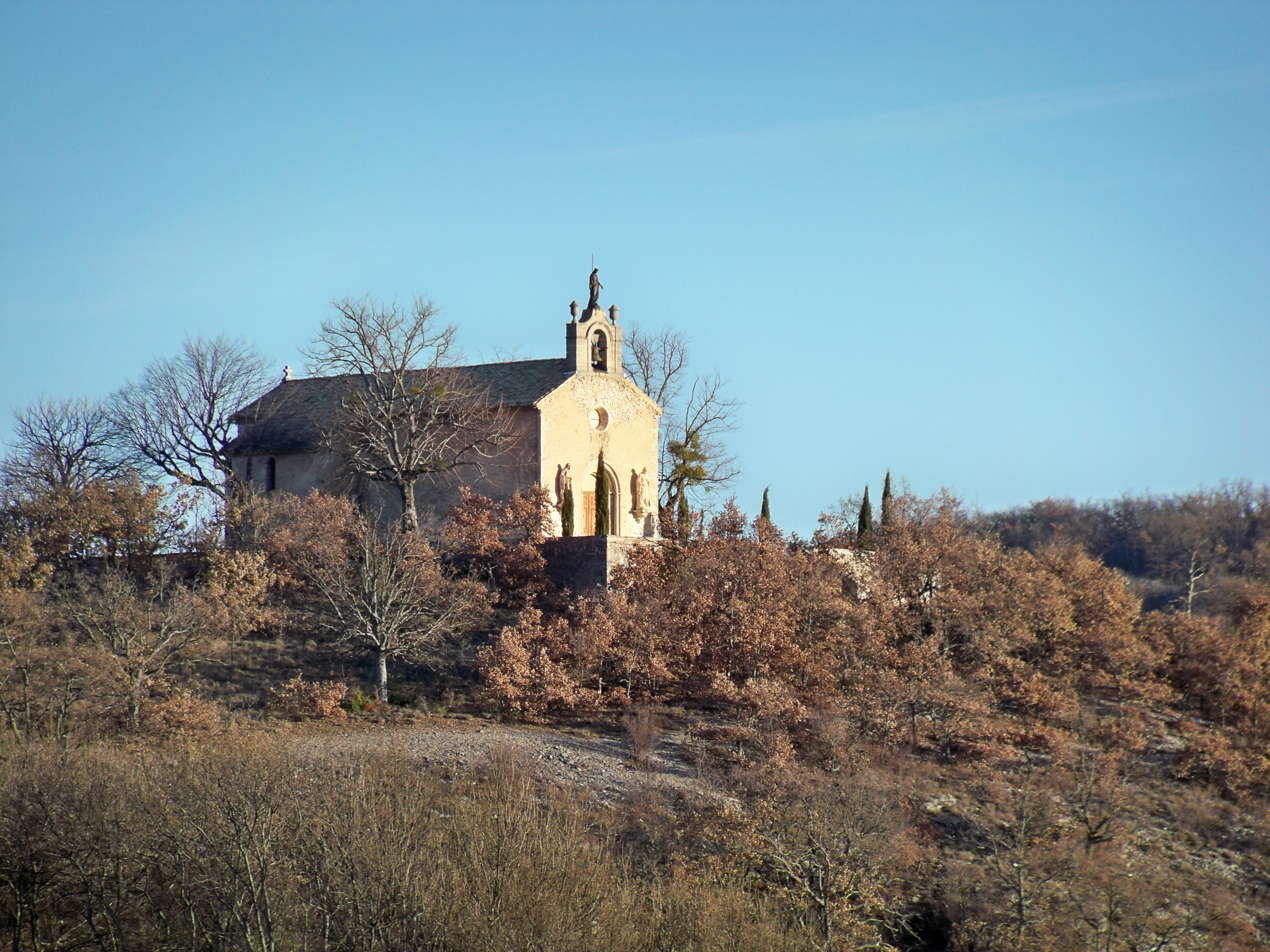
The Chapel of Notre-Dame-des-Anges

The scattered settlements explains the presence of numerous chapels and two parishes in the 19th century. At least four other chapels have disappeared. Banon has two parish churches and three chapels remaining:

- The Church of Saint Mark is located at the top of the village in Romanesque style dating from 1652. It contains an ex-voto from 1864 representing a woman lying with her husband praying to the Virgin Mary.
- The Church of Saint-Just-et-Notre-Dame-des-Anges or lower church is located at the bottom of the village and was built from 1909 to 1911. The roof collapsed in 1950 and was replaced by a ceiling. It has a small bell tower.
- The Chapel of Notre-Dame-du-Bon-Secours at Granges de Dauban (1769)
- The Chapel of Saint Mark at Largue
- The Chapel of Notre-Dame-des-Anges is isolated on the plateau and dates in part from the end of the 13th century. It is possible that its foundation is older as it is located on a place that has been settled since Gallo-Roman times. It was initially called Sainte-Marie-du-Largue. The apse is in cul-de-four (Note: A vault in the form of a quarter of a sphere.) with a flat chevet and the Choir is framed by two chapels. The vault of the nave was probably rebuilt in the 19th century during numerous works which were done under the Concordat of 1801. The door is topped by concentric arches (Voussures) supported by columns. Two statues of angels with Speech scrolls flank the door. The bell tower is topped by a statue of the Virgin Mary. The chapel contains several items that are registered as historical objects:
  - An ex-voto Painting: Appearance of the Virgin (1823)
  - An ex-voto Painting: Appearance of the Virgin (1861)
  - An ex-voto Painting: Appearance of the Virgin (1880)
  - An ex-voto Painting: Family kneeling before the Virgin (18th century)
  - An ex-voto Painting: Apparition of the Virgin and child (1864)

=== Banon and the cinema ===
Banon is the village where the story takes place of The Man Who Planted Trees by Jean Giono. The animated film adaptation by Frédéric Back (1987) won the Oscar for Best Short Film in 1988.

== Notable people linked to the commune ==
- Jean François Palhier de Sylvabelle (1748-1822), MP for the Council of Five Hundred

== See also ==
- Communes of the Alpes-de-Haute-Provence department

=== Bibliography ===
- Raymond Collier, Haute-Provence monumental and artistic, Digne, Imprimerie Louis Jean, 1986, 559 p. (in French)
- Under the direction of Edward Baratier, Georges Duby, and Ernest Hildesheimer, Historical Atlas. Provence, Venaissin County, Principality of Orange, County of Nice, Principality of Monaco, Paris, Librairie Armand Colin, 1969, BNF FRBNF35450017h, (in French)
- Patrick Ollivier-Elliott, Lands of Sault, Albion, and Banon - Record of an attentive traveller, ISBN 978-2-85744-859-4 (in French)

=== External links ===
- Banon official website (in French)
- Banon on the old National Geographic Institute website (in French)
- Banon on Géoportail, National Geographic Institute (IGN) website (in French)
- Banon on the 1750 Cassini Map
