= Saignon =

Saignon Sanhon (Occitan)
- Commune
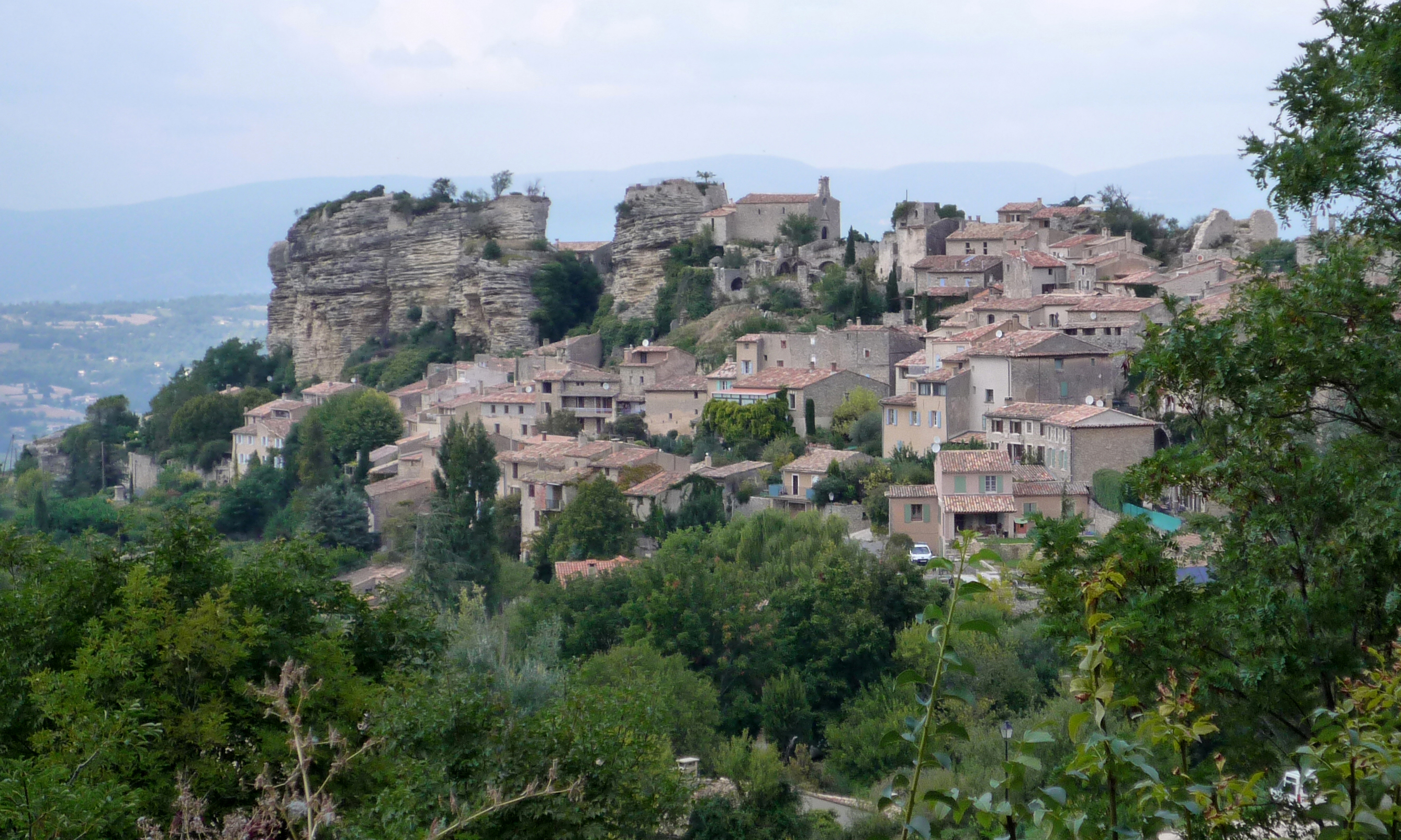
- A general view of Saignon

- Coat of arms
- Location of Saignon
- Location within France Location within Provence-Alpes-Côte d'Azur
- Coordinates: 43°51′50″N 5°25′44″E
- Country: France
- Region: Provence-Alpes-Côte d'Azur
- Department: Vaucluse
- Arrondissement: Apt
- Canton: Apt
- Intercommunality: CC Pays d'Apt-Luberon

Government
  - Mayor (2020–2026): Jean-Pierre Haucourt
- Area^{1}: 19.6 km^{2} (7.6 sq mi)
- Elevation: 450 m (1,480 ft)
- Highest elevation: 634 m (2,080 ft)
- Lowest elevation: 230 m (750 ft)
- Population (2023): 912
  - Density: 46.5/km^{2} (121/sq mi)
- Demonym: Saignonnais
- Time zone: UTC+01:00 (CET)
  - Summer (DST): UTC+02:00 (CEST)
- INSEE/Postal code: 84105 /84400
- Website: saignon.fr
- ^{1} French Land Register data, which excludes lakes, ponds, glaciers > 1 km^{2} (0.386 sq mi or 247 acres) and river estuaries.

Saignon (French pronunciation: [sɛɲɔ̃]; Occitan: Sanhon) is a commune in the Vaucluse department in the Provence-Alpes-Côte d'Azur region in Southeastern France. The nearest town is Apt, to the northwest.

There is a bakery/cafe, two restaurants, and a general store. The school has about 100 students. Saignon has a post office.

== History ==
The area was first occupied in the Middle Palaeolithic age. The rock at Saignon, on a prominent location over the valley, was used as an ancient observatory and possibly a signal station. The name Saignon is believed to derive from the word "Sagnio", which comes from "signum".

Saignon had three châteaus built in 946, 976 and 1032.

The 12th century Romanesque church of Notre-Dame de Pitié, also known as Saint Mary of Saignon, has been a stopping point for religious pilgrims since the Middle Ages: in addition to local pilgrims from Provence, it was positioned on the way for those traveling to Rome along the Via Domitia, and for Italian pilgrims going to Santiago de Compostela in Spain.

The 11th century Benedictine Abbaye Saint-Eusèbe, located just outside the town, traces its history to an earlier 6th-century structure. After being destroyed and rebuilt several times, the Lord of Saignon restored the abbey to the Order of Saint Giles, which received support from the Benedictine Cluny Abbey and its abbot, St. Odilon. Pope Urban II passed through the area in 1096 and devoted the church which had been recently rebuilt. The abbey is now rented to the public for events. A conference was held in 2004 celebrating the 1000 anniversary of the abbey (founded in 1004).

== Geography ==
The village is 4 km (2 mi) from Apt, and sits on a prominent point over the valley. The Calavon forms the commune's north-eastern border.

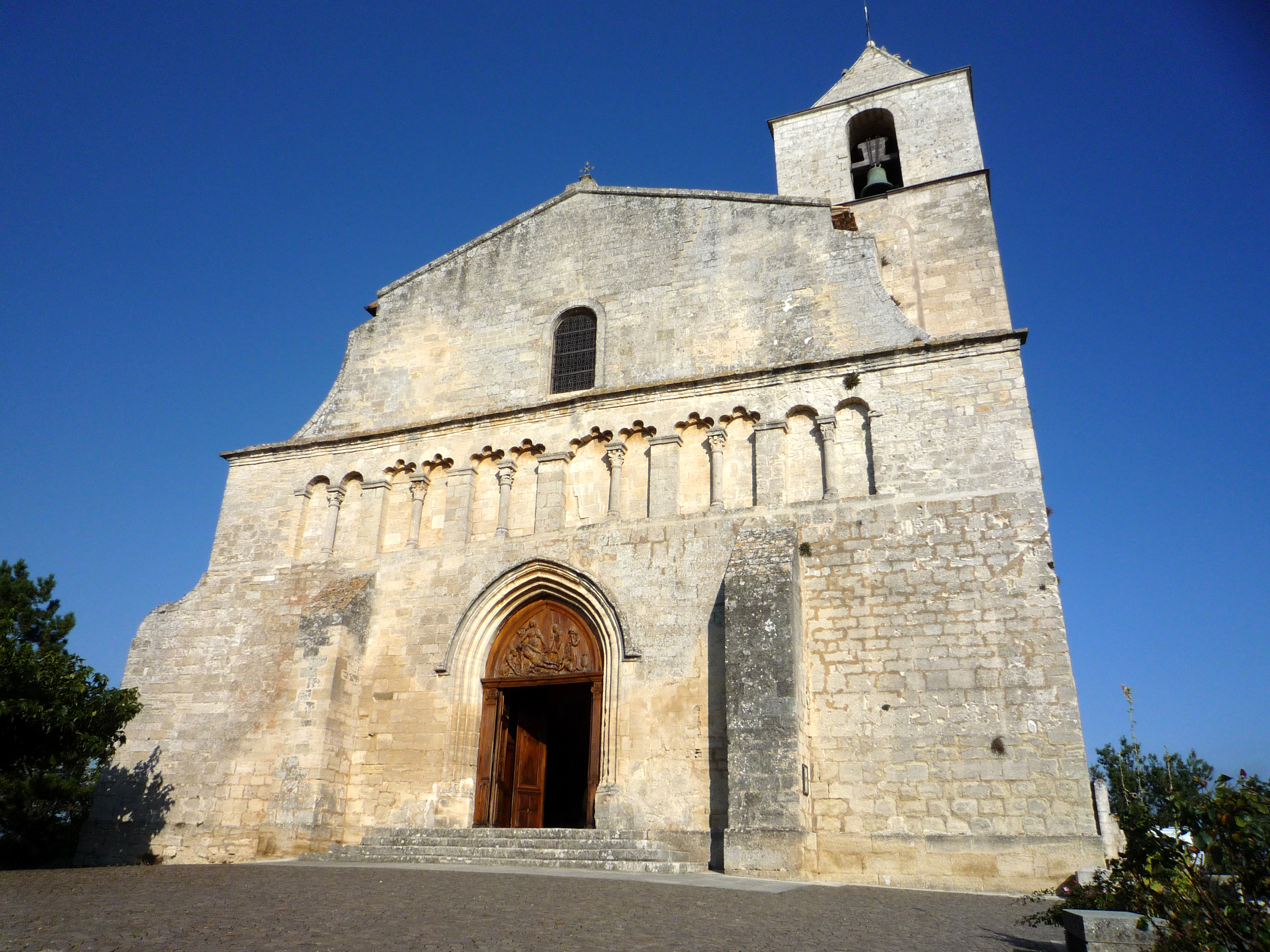
Notre-Dame de Pitié, a stop for religious pilgrims

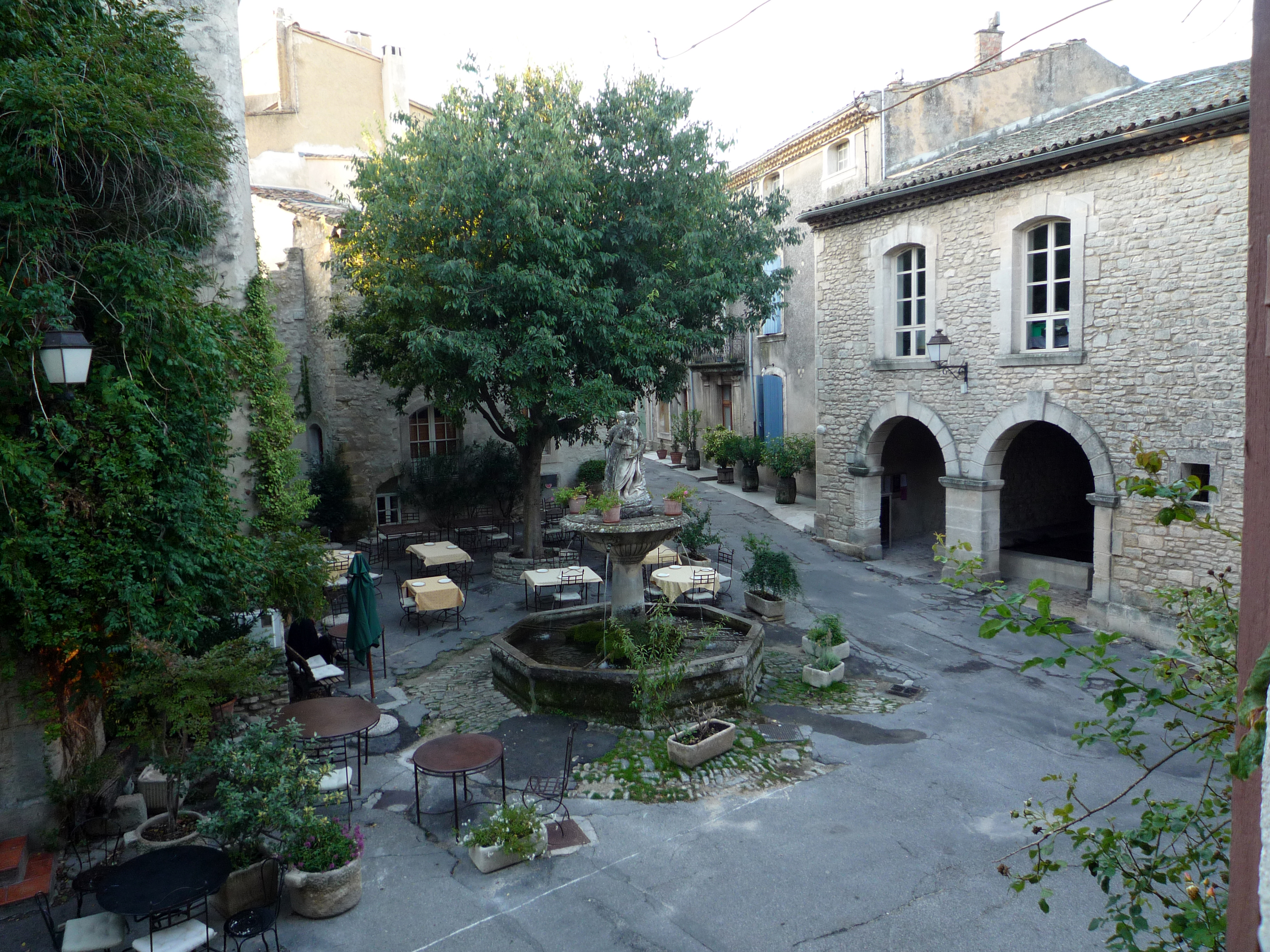
Main square in Saignon

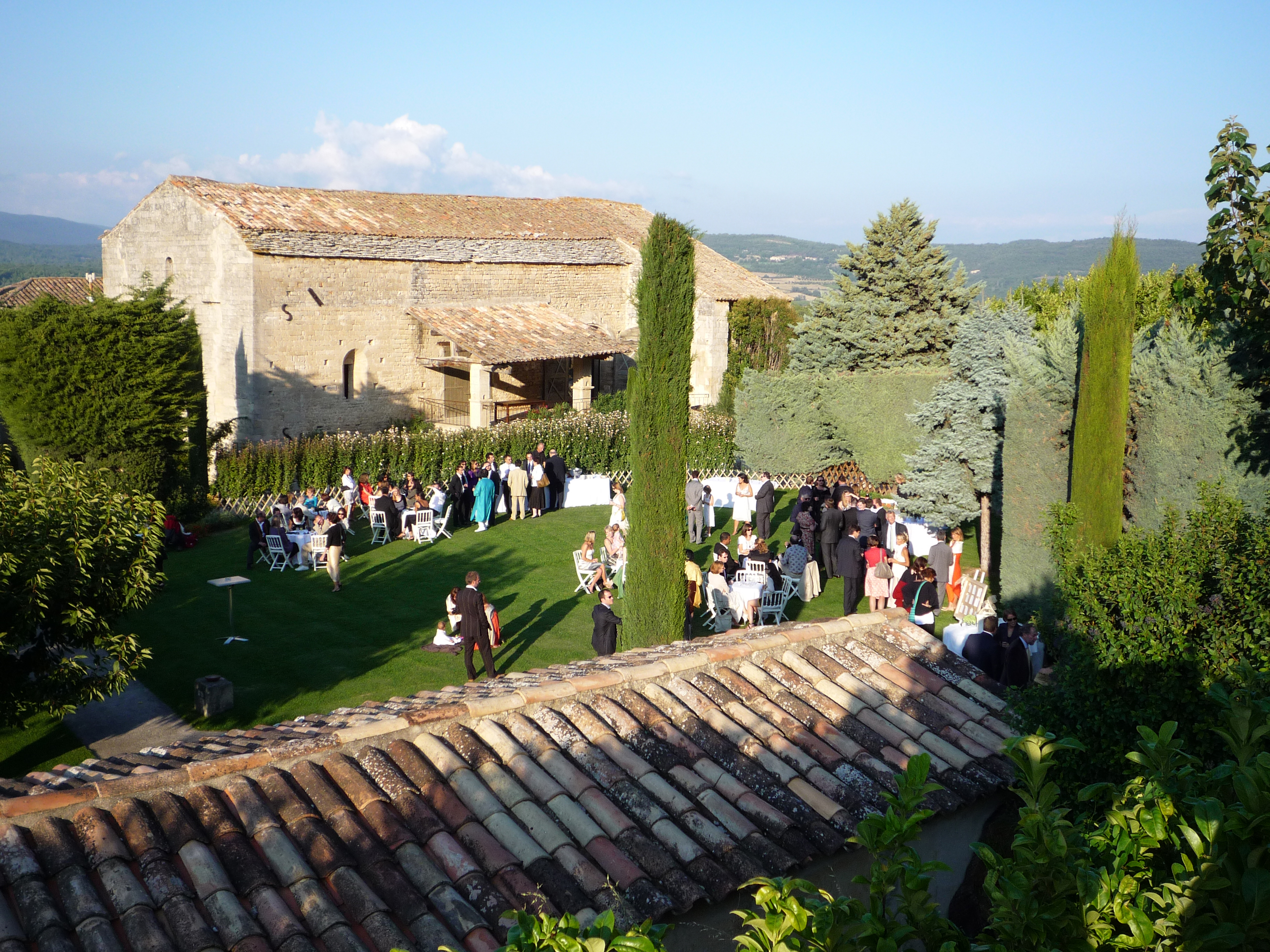
Abbaye Saint-Eusèbe, now used for private events

== See also ==
- Côtes du Luberon AOC
- Communes of the Vaucluse department
- Luberon
