= Gignac, Vaucluse =

Gignac
- Commune
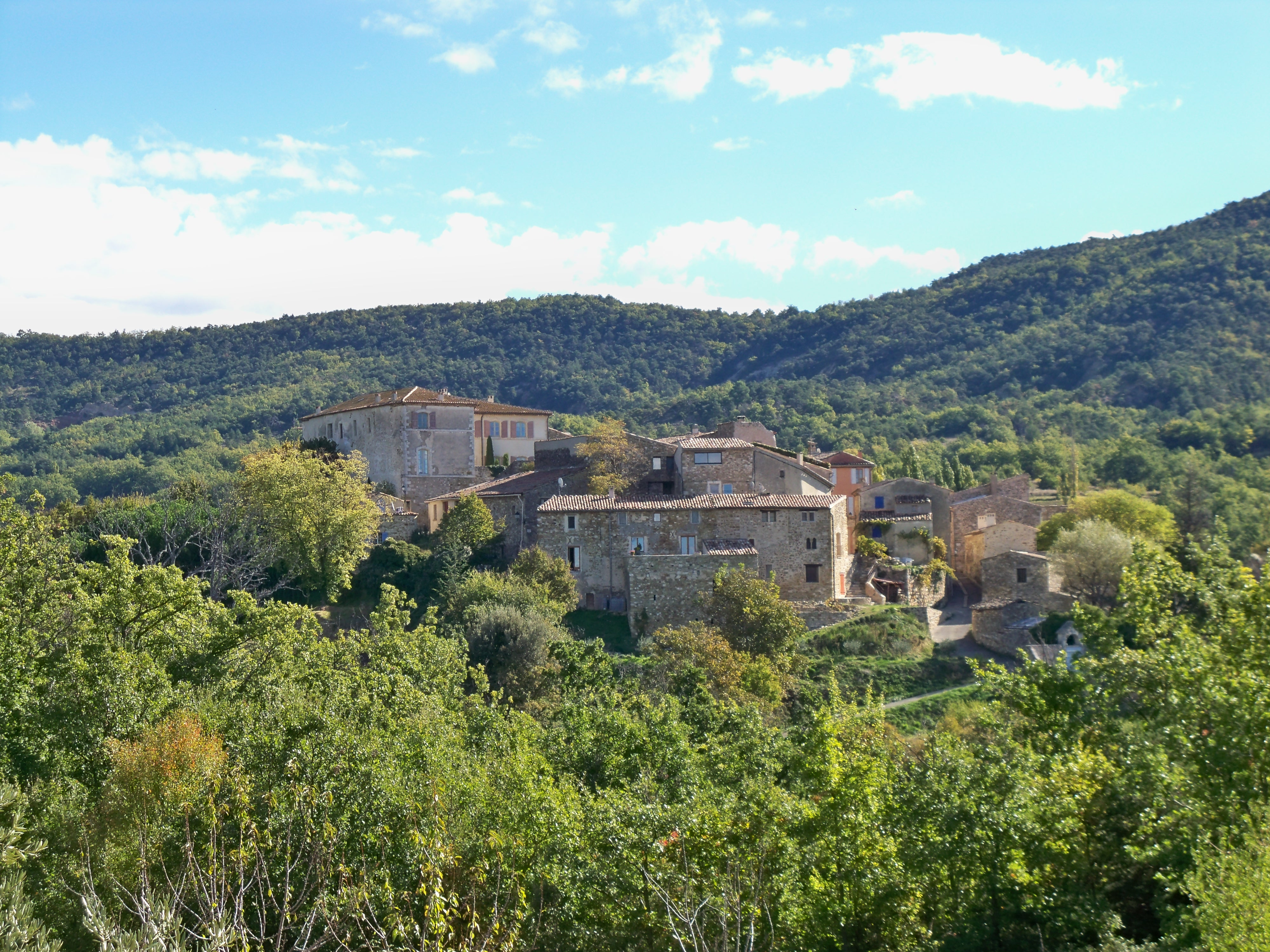
- The village of Gignac

- Coat of arms
- Location of Gignac
- Location within France Location within Provence-Alpes-Côte d'Azur
- Coordinates: 43°55′12″N 5°31′39″E
- Country: France
- Region: Provence-Alpes-Côte d'Azur
- Department: Vaucluse
- Arrondissement: Apt
- Canton: Apt

Government
  - Mayor (2020–2026): Sylvie Pasquini
- Area^{1}: 8.15 km^{2} (3.15 sq mi)
- Elevation: 450 m (1,480 ft)
- Highest elevation: 834 m (2,736 ft)
- Lowest elevation: 366 m (1,201 ft)
- Population (2023): 73
  - Density: 9.0/km^{2} (23/sq mi)
- Time zone: UTC+01:00 (CET)
  - Summer (DST): UTC+02:00 (CEST)
- INSEE/Postal code: 84048 /84400
- ^{1} French Land Register data, which excludes lakes, ponds, glaciers > 1 km^{2} (0.386 sq mi or 247 acres) and river estuaries.

Gignac (French pronunciation: [ʒiɲak]; Occitan: Ginhac) is a commune in the Vaucluse department in the Provence-Alpes-Côte d'Azur region in southeastern France. Chateau d'Autet lies to the northeast of the village. A restored 18th century chateau and official historical landmark, the Chateau de Gignac, sits atop a hill overlooking the hamlet of Gignac. An earlier chateau at this location was damaged in 1575 during the French Wars of Religion, and was rebuilt between 1760 and 1780 on the eve of the French Revolution.

== See also ==
- Communes of the Vaucluse department
