= Viens, Vaucluse =

Viens
- Commune
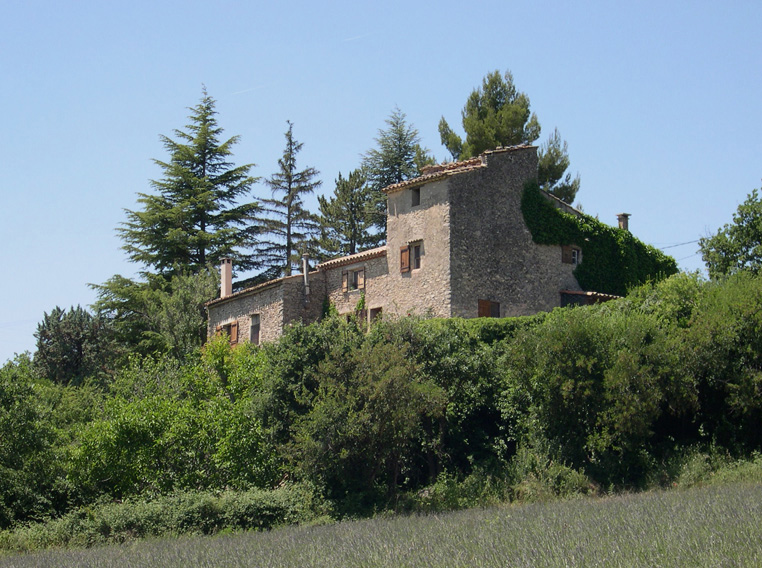
- 18th-century farmhouse

- Coat of arms
- Location of Viens
- Location within France Location within Provence-Alpes-Côte d'Azur
- Coordinates: 43°53′46″N 5°34′03″E
- Country: France
- Region: Provence-Alpes-Côte d'Azur
- Department: Vaucluse
- Arrondissement: Apt
- Canton: Apt

Government
  - Mayor (2020–2026): Frédéric Roux
- Area^{1}: 34.59 km^{2} (13.36 sq mi)
- Elevation: 610 m (2,000 ft)
- Highest elevation: 784 m (2,572 ft)
- Lowest elevation: 332 m (1,089 ft)
- Population (2023): 626
  - Density: 18.1/km^{2} (46.9/sq mi)
- Time zone: UTC+01:00 (CET)
  - Summer (DST): UTC+02:00 (CEST)
- INSEE/Postal code: 84144 /84750
- ^{1} French Land Register data, which excludes lakes, ponds, glaciers > 1 km^{2} (0.386 sq mi or 247 acres) and river estuaries.

Viens (Occitan: Viènç) is a commune in the Vaucluse department in the Provence-Alpes-Côte d'Azur region in southeastern France.

Viens is an ancient village that has retained its appearance as a medieval stronghold. It is famous for its ramparts, Saracen gate and Clock Tower.

== Geography ==
The river Calavon forms most of the commune's south-eastern border.

== Landmarks ==
- Chateau d'Autet

== See also ==
- Communes of the Vaucluse department
- Luberon
