= Canton of Orange-Est =

Coordinates: 44°09′59″N 4°52′11″E

Orange-Est
- Former canton
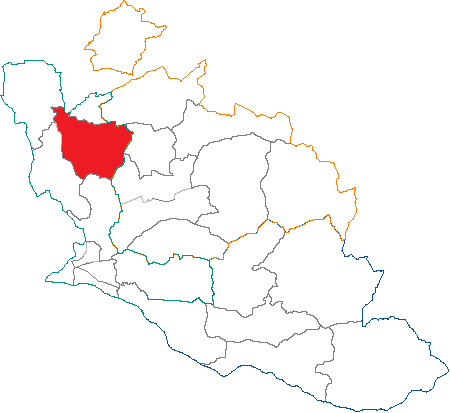
- Country: France
- Region: Provence-Alpes-Côte d'Azur
- Department: Vaucluse
- No. of communes: {{{nbcomm}}}
- Disbanded: 2015
- Area: 142.15 km^{2} (54.88 sq mi)
- Population (2012): 29,889
  - Density: 210.26/km^{2} (544.58/sq mi)

The canton of Orange-Est is a French former administrative division in the department of Vaucluse and region Provence-Alpes-Côte d'Azur. It had 29,889 inhabitants (2012). It was disbanded following the French canton reorganisation which came into effect in March 2015.

== Composition ==
The communes in the canton of Orange-Est:

- Camaret-sur-Aigues
- Jonquières
- Orange (partly)
- Sérignan-du-Comtat
- Travaillan
- Uchaux
- Violès
