= Arrondissement of Carpentras =

Coordinates: 44.05°N 5.05°E

Carpentras
- Arrondissement
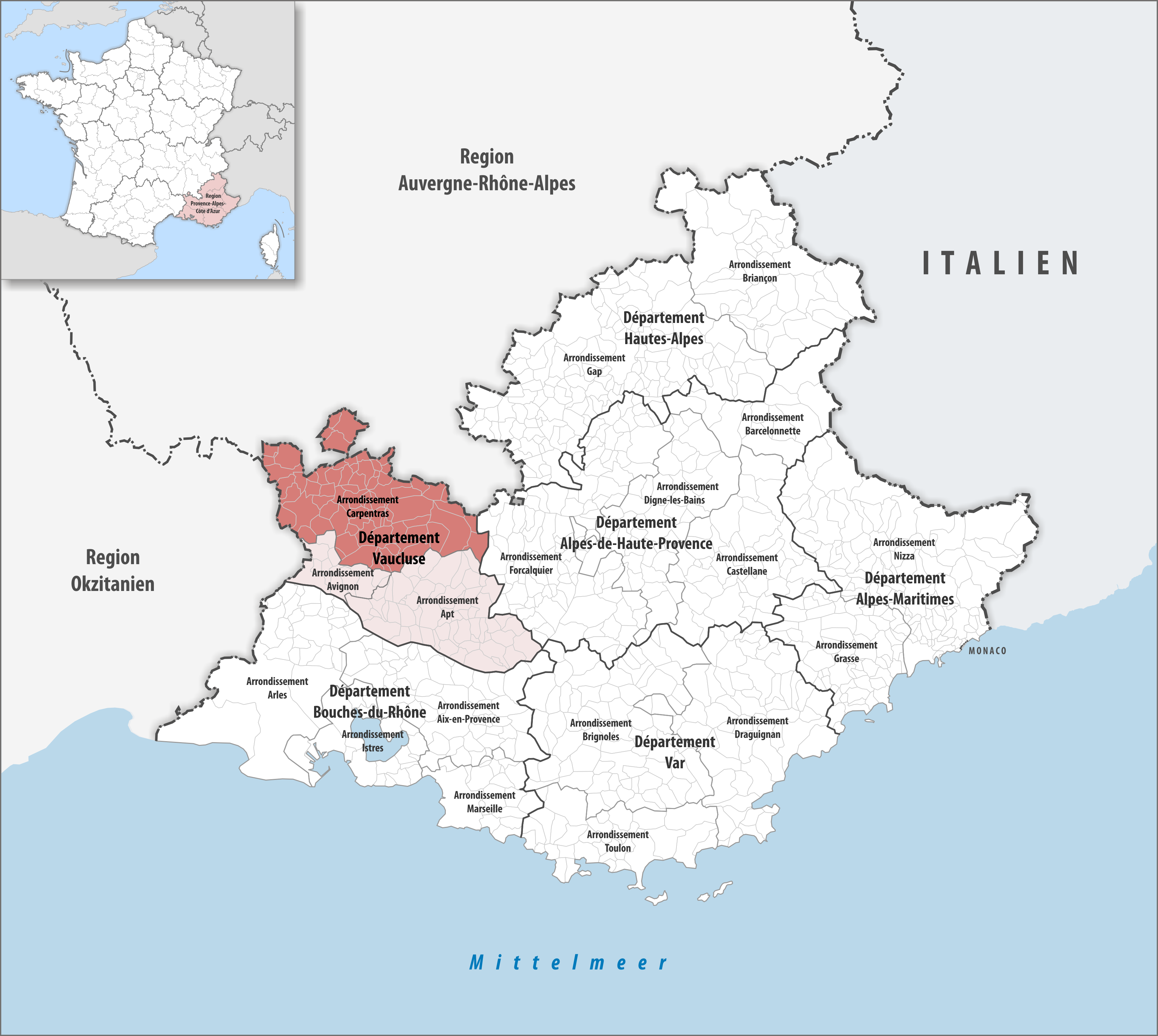
- Location within the region Provence-Alpes-Côte d'Azur
- Country: France
- Region: Provence-Alpes-Côte d'Azur
- Department: Vaucluse
- No. of communes: {{{nbcomm}}}
- Area: 1,839.8 km^{2} (710.4 sq mi)
- Population (2023): 229,505
  - Density: 124.74/km^{2} (323.09/sq mi)
- INSEE code: 843

The arrondissement of Carpentras is an arrondissement of France in the Vaucluse department in the Provence-Alpes-Côte d'Azur region. It has 78 communes. Its population is 226,140 (2021), and its area is 1,839.8 km^{2} (710.4 sq mi).

== Composition ==
The communes of the arrondissement of Carpentras, and their INSEE codes, are:

1. Althen-des-Paluds (84001)
2. Aubignan (84004)
3. Aurel (84005)
4. Le Barroux (84008)
5. Le Beaucet (84011)
6. Beaumes-de-Venise (84012)
7. Beaumont-du-Ventoux (84015)
8. Bédoin (84017)
9. Blauvac (84018)
10. Bollène (84019)
11. Brantes (84021)
12. Buisson (84022)
13. Caderousse (84027)
14. Cairanne (84028)
15. Camaret-sur-Aigues (84029)
16. Caromb (84030)
17. Carpentras (84031)
18. Châteauneuf-du-Pape (84037)
19. Courthézon (84039)
20. Crestet (84040)
21. Crillon-le-Brave (84041)
22. Entrechaux (84044)
23. Faucon (84045)
24. Flassan (84046)
25. Gigondas (84049)
26. Grillon (84053)
27. Jonquières (84056)
28. Lafare (84059)
29. Lagarde-Paréol (84061)
30. Lamotte-du-Rhône (84063)
31. Lapalud (84064)
32. Loriol-du-Comtat (84067)
33. Malaucène (84069)
34. Malemort-du-Comtat (84070)
35. Mazan (84072)
36. Méthamis (84075)
37. Modène (84077)
38. Mondragon (84078)
39. Monieux (84079)
40. Monteux (84080)
41. Mormoiron (84082)
42. Mornas (84083)
43. Orange (84087)
44. Pernes-les-Fontaines (84088)
45. Piolenc (84091)
46. Puyméras (84094)
47. Rasteau (84096)
48. Richerenches (84097)
49. Roaix (84098)
50. La Roque-Alric (84100)
51. La Roque-sur-Pernes (84101)
52. Sablet (84104)
53. Saint-Christol (84107)
54. Saint-Didier (84108)
55. Sainte-Cécile-les-Vignes (84106)
56. Saint-Hippolyte-le-Graveyron (84109)
57. Saint-Léger-du-Ventoux (84110)
58. Saint-Marcellin-lès-Vaison (84111)
59. Saint-Pierre-de-Vassols (84115)
60. Saint-Romain-en-Viennois (84116)
61. Saint-Roman-de-Malegarde (84117)
62. Saint-Trinit (84120)
63. Sarrians (84122)
64. Sault (84123)
65. Savoillan (84125)
66. Séguret (84126)
67. Sérignan-du-Comtat (84127)
68. Suzette (84130)
69. Travaillan (84134)
70. Uchaux (84135)
71. Vacqueyras (84136)
72. Vaison-la-Romaine (84137)
73. Valréas (84138)
74. Venasque (84143)
75. Villedieu (84146)
76. Villes-sur-Auzon (84148)
77. Violès (84149)
78. Visan (84150)

== History ==
The arrondissement of Carpentras was created in 1800. At the January 2017 reorganisation of the arrondissements of Vaucluse, it received 21 communes from the arrondissement of Avignon, and it lost two communes to the arrondissement of Avignon.

As a result of the reorganisation of the cantons of France which came into effect in 2015, the borders of the cantons are no longer related to the borders of the arrondissements. The cantons of the arrondissement of Carpentras were, as of January 2015:

1. Beaumes-de-Venise
2. Carpentras-Nord
3. Carpentras-Sud
4. Malaucène
5. Mormoiron
6. Pernes-les-Fontaines
7. Sault
8. Vaison-la-Romaine
