= Canton of Malaucène =

Coordinates: 44°11′10″N 5°13′04″E

Malaucène
- Former canton
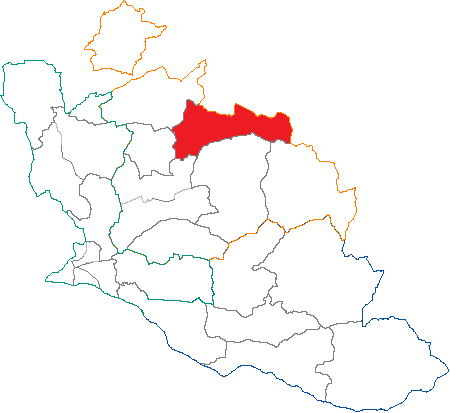
- Country: France
- Region: Provence-Alpes-Côte d'Azur
- Department: Vaucluse
- No. of communes: {{{nbcomm}}}
- Disbanded: 2015
- Area: 159.49 km^{2} (61.58 sq mi)
- Population (2012): 4,980
  - Density: 31.2/km^{2} (80.9/sq mi)

The canton of Malaucène is a former French administrative division in the department of Vaucluse and region of Provence-Alpes-Côte d'Azur. It had 4,980 inhabitants (2012). It was disbanded following the French canton reorganisation which came into effect in March 2015. It consisted of 7 communes, which joined the canton of Vaison-la-Romaine in 2015.

== Composition ==
The communes in the canton of Malaucène:

- Le Barroux
- Beaumont-du-Ventoux
- Brantes
- Entrechaux
- Malaucène
- Saint-Léger-du-Ventoux
- Savoillan
