= Buisson, Vaucluse =

Buisson
- Commune
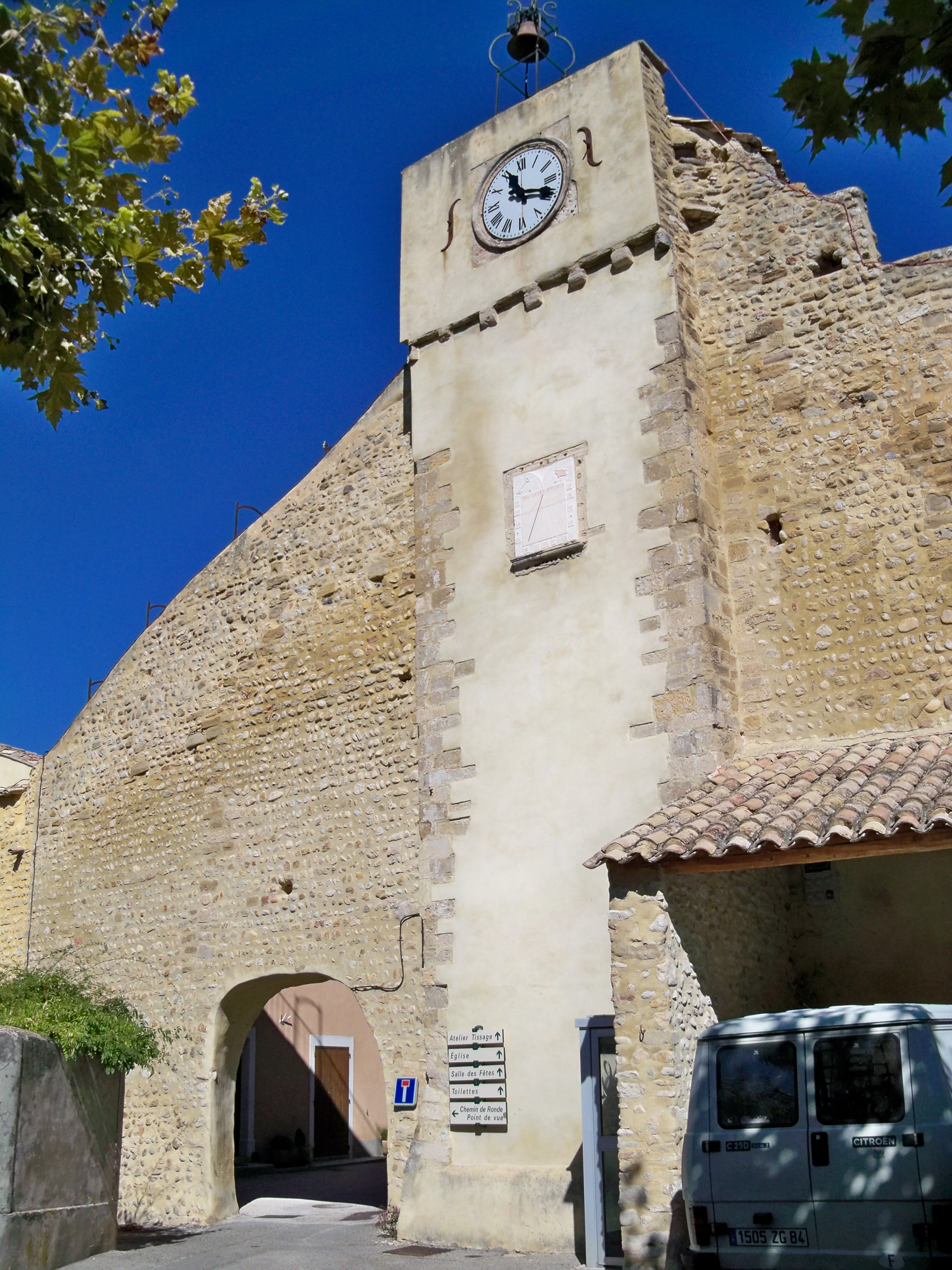
- The belfry of Buisson

- Coat of arms
- Location of Buisson
- Location within France Location within Provence-Alpes-Côte d'Azur
- Coordinates: 44°16′52″N 4°59′55″E
- Country: France
- Region: Provence-Alpes-Côte d'Azur
- Department: Vaucluse
- Arrondissement: Carpentras
- Canton: Vaison-la-Romaine

Government
  - Mayor (2020–2026): Chantal Fritsch
- Area^{1}: 9.49 km^{2} (3.66 sq mi)
- Elevation: 210 m (690 ft)
- Highest elevation: 395 m (1,296 ft)
- Lowest elevation: 156 m (512 ft)
- Population (2023): 252
  - Density: 26.6/km^{2} (68.8/sq mi)
- Time zone: UTC+01:00 (CET)
  - Summer (DST): UTC+02:00 (CEST)
- INSEE/Postal code: 84022 /84110
- ^{1} French Land Register data, which excludes lakes, ponds, glaciers > 1 km^{2} (0.386 sq mi or 247 acres) and river estuaries.

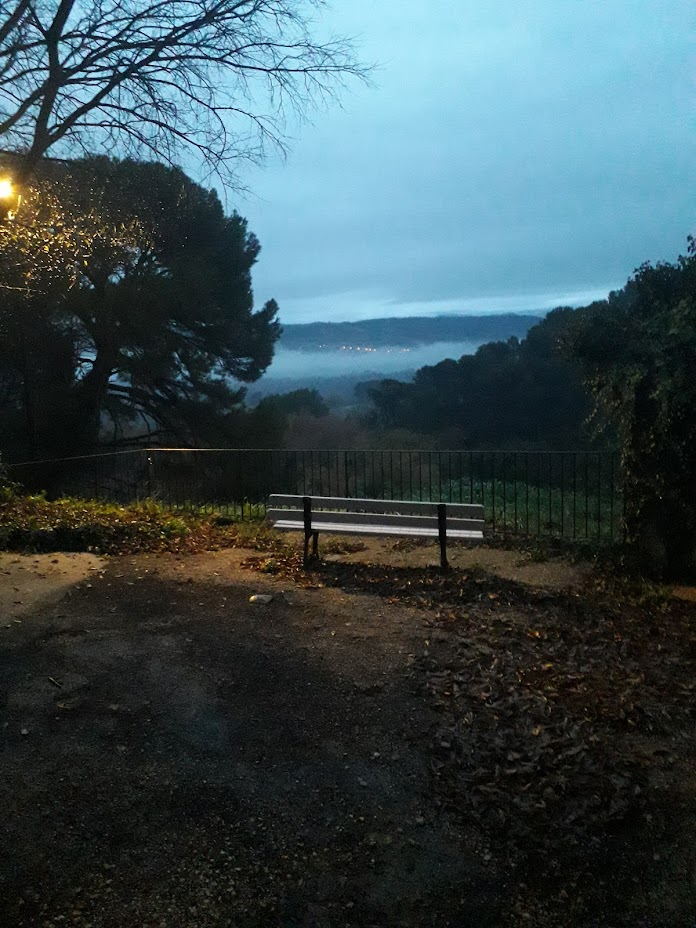
One of the many benches in Buisson, this one situated on the north side of the village pictured in winter 2022

Buisson (French pronunciation: [bɥisɔ̃]; Occitan: Boisson) is a commune in the Vaucluse department in the Provence-Alpes-Côte d'Azur region in southeastern France.

Buisson is a small, wine-producing, Knights Templar village, dating back at least as far as the 12th century, and linked since its beginning to the nearby village of Villedieu, with which it produces its principal crop, Côtes-du-Rhône wine, which is sold from their joint winery, le Cellier du Templier.

== Geography ==
Situated above the Aygues river, Buisson lies at the northern edge of the Vaucluse and within sight of the southern border of the Drôme, the département immediately to its north. Located 9 km (5 miles) northwest of the small, Roman town of Vaison-la-Romaine, known as "the French Pompeii," Buisson is one of fourteen communes surrounding that city that share its postal address: 84110 Vaison-la-Romaine.

== Economy ==
Besides its wine, Buisson produces in small quantities such products as olives, apricots, cherries, figs, lavender, and numerous other vegetables and fruits. It is situated above the same valley as Nyons, the ancient olive capital of France, and within an hour's drive of the Mediterranean Sea, from which fresh-caught seafood is brought to neighboring markets at Vaison, Valréas, Nyons, Malaucène, and Tulette, as well as to the nearby cities of Carpentras, Orange, Avignon, and L'Isle-sur-la-Sorgue.

It also has an active bistrot which generates a small amount of revenue and is owned by the council. There are multiple bed and breakfasts situated in and around the village which are all privately owned but attract in excess of 100 tourists yearly.

Small business ventures started by locals involve hat sellers, toymakers, rose farmers, and even apricot jam merchants.

== Sights ==
Buisson, whose population rises to approximately 360 inhabitants in summer, is a pretty, typically Provençal village, whose annual wine fête occurs in July. Its physical attractions include an intact, inner medieval walled section with two entrances, one of which housed a 14th-century portcullis; a church dating from at least the 12th century, Notre Dame Del Bois, whose northern yard affords views of the entire region; and two lavoirs, one, on its main plaza, with an attractive, but dilapidated and uncared for fountain. The site of Buisson's medieval castle now includes a large residence, which was constructed several centuries after the original structure disappeared.

== Buildings ==
In 2020, the council took on the task of renovating and restoring the castle behind the lookout point.

Another project undertaken was the restoration and reopening of the Pigeonnier (dovecote) situated just outside the village. The idea was to turn it into a small art gallery in which local artists of the surrounding villages could display their work.

One proposed idea for the field where the Pigeonnier was situated was to build a small Super U supermarket but this was rejected by members of the council. Instead, olive trees were planted and benches were installed.

When the lookout point collapsed in late 2022, the area was soon cordoned off and the century-old walls were rebuilt to provide a safer structure.

== See also ==
- Communes of the Vaucluse department
