= Canton of Carpentras-Nord =

Coordinates: 44°05′32″N 5°02′19″E

Carpentras-Nord
- Former canton
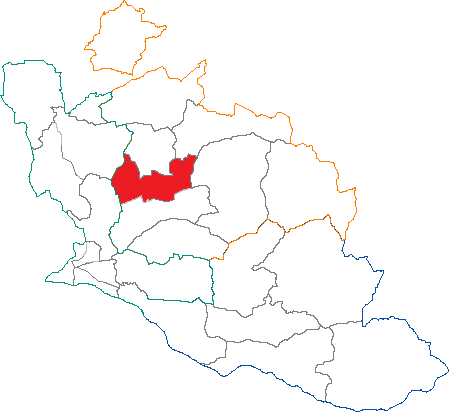
- Country: France
- Region: Provence-Alpes-Côte d'Azur
- Department: Vaucluse
- No. of communes: {{{nbcomm}}}
- Disbanded: 2015
- Area: 108.01 km^{2} (41.70 sq mi)
- Population (2012): 31,444
  - Density: 291.12/km^{2} (754.00/sq mi)

The canton of Carpentras-Nord is a French administrative division in the department of Vaucluse and region Provence-Alpes-Côte d'Azur. It had 31,444 inhabitants (2012). It was disbanded following the French canton reorganisation which came into effect in March 2015.

== Composition ==
The communes in the canton of Carpentras-Nord:

- Aubignan
- Caromb
- Carpentras (partly)
- Loriol-du-Comtat
- Saint-Hippolyte-le-Graveyron
- Sarrians
