= Canton of Beaumes-de-Venise =

Coordinates: 44°10′12″N 5°00′06″E

Beaumes-de-Venise
- Former canton
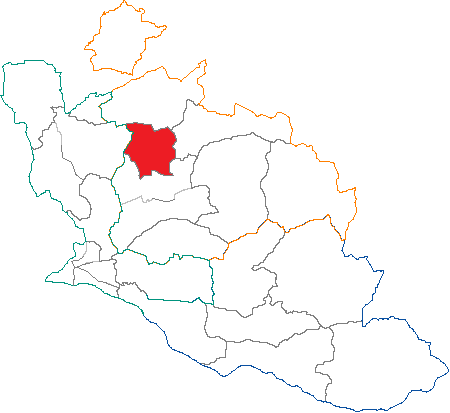
- Country: France
- Region: Provence-Alpes-Côte d'Azur
- Department: Vaucluse
- No. of communes: {{{nbcomm}}}
- Disbanded: 2015
- Area: 82.02 km^{2} (31.67 sq mi)
- Population (2012): 5,519
  - Density: 67.29/km^{2} (174.3/sq mi)

The canton of Beaumes-de-Venise is a French former administrative division in the department of Vaucluse and region Provence-Alpes-Côte d'Azur. It had 5,519 inhabitants (2012). It was disbanded following the French canton reorganisation which came into effect in March 2015.

== Composition ==
The communes in the canton of Beaumes-de-Venise:

- Beaumes-de-Venise
- Gigondas
- Lafare
- La Roque-Alric
- Sablet
- Suzette
- Vacqueyras
