= Communes of the Vaucluse department =

The following is a list of the 151 communes of the Vaucluse department of France.

The communes cooperate in the following intercommunalities (as of 2025):

- Métropole d'Aix-Marseille-Provence (partly)
- Communauté d'agglomération du Grand Avignon (partly)
- Communauté d'agglomération Luberon Monts de Vaucluse
- Communauté d'agglomération des Sorgues du Comtat
- Communauté d'agglomération Ventoux-Comtat Venaissin
- Communauté de communes Aygues Ouvèze en Provence
- Communauté de communes Enclave des Papes-Pays de Grignan (partly)
- Communauté de communes Pays d'Apt-Luberon (partly)
- Communauté de communes du Pays des Sorgues et des Monts de Vaucluse
- Communauté de communes Pays d'Orange en Provence
- Communauté de communes Rhône Lez Provence
- Communauté de communes Sud Luberon
- Communauté de communes Vaison Ventoux (partly)
- Communauté de communes Ventoux Sud (partly)

INSEE code	Postal code	Commune
84001	84210	Althen-des-Paluds
84002	84240	Ansouis
84003	84400	Apt
84004	84810	Aubignan
84005	84390	Aurel
84006	84400	Auribeau
84007	84000	Avignon
84008	84330	Le Barroux
84009	84240	La Bastide-des-Jourdans
84010	84120	La Bastidonne
84011	84210	Le Beaucet
84012	84190	Beaumes-de-Venise
84013	84220	Beaumettes
84014	84120	Beaumont-de-Pertuis
84015	84340	Beaumont-du-Ventoux
84016	84370	Bédarrides
84017	84410	Bédoin
84018	84570	Blauvac
84019	84500	Bollène
84020	84480	Bonnieux
84021	84390	Brantes
84022	84110	Buisson
84023	84480	Buoux
84024	84240	Cabrières-d'Aigues
84025	84220	Cabrières-d'Avignon
84026	84160	Cadenet
84027	84860	Caderousse
84028	84290	Cairanne
84029	84850	Camaret-sur-Aigues
84030	84330	Caromb
84031	84200	Carpentras
84032	84750	Caseneuve
84033	84400	Castellet-en-Luberon
84034	84510	Caumont-sur-Durance
84035	84300	Cavaillon
84036	84470	Châteauneuf-de-Gadagne
84037	84230	Châteauneuf-du-Pape
84038	84460	Cheval-Blanc
84039	84350	Courthézon
84040	84110	Crestet
84041	84410	Crillon-le-Brave
84042	84160	Cucuron
84043	84320	Entraigues-sur-la-Sorgue
84044	84340	Entrechaux
84045	84110	Faucon
84046	84410	Flassan
84139	84800	Fontaine-de-Vaucluse
84047	84400	Gargas
84048	84400	Gignac
84049	84190	Gigondas
84050	84220	Gordes
84051	84220	Goult
84052	84240	Grambois
84053	84600	Grillon
84054	84800	L'Isle-sur-la-Sorgue
84055	84450	Jonquerettes
84056	84150	Jonquières
84057	84220	Joucas
84058	84480	Lacoste
84059	84190	Lafare
84060	84400	Lagarde-d'Apt
84061	84290	Lagarde-Paréol
84062	84800	Lagnes
84063	84840	Lamotte-du-Rhône
84064	84840	Lapalud
84065	84360	Lauris
84066	84220	Lioux
84067	84870	Loriol-du-Comtat
84068	84160	Lourmarin
84069	84340	Malaucène
84070	84570	Malemort-du-Comtat
84071	84660	Maubec
84072	84380	Mazan
84073	84560	Ménerbes
84074	84360	Mérindol
84075	84570	Méthamis
84076	84120	Mirabeau

INSEE code	Postal code	Commune
84077	84330	Modène
84078	84430	Mondragon
84079	84390	Monieux
84080	84170	Monteux
84081	84310	Morières-lès-Avignon
84082	84570	Mormoiron
84083	84550	Mornas
84084	84240	La Motte-d'Aigues
84085	84220	Murs
84086	84580	Oppède
84087	84100	Orange
84088	84210	Pernes-les-Fontaines
84089	84120	Pertuis
84090	84240	Peypin-d'Aigues
84091	84420	Piolenc
84092	84130	Le Pontet
84093	84360	Puget
84094	84110	Puyméras
84095	84160	Puyvert
84096	84110	Rasteau
84097	84600	Richerenches
84098	84110	Roaix
84099	84440	Robion
84100	84190	La Roque-Alric
84101	84210	La Roque-sur-Pernes
84102	84220	Roussillon
84103	84400	Rustrel
84104	84110	Sablet
84105	84400	Saignon
84107	84390	Saint-Christol
84108	84210	Saint-Didier
84106	84290	Sainte-Cécile-les-Vignes
84109	84330	Saint-Hippolyte-le-Graveyron
84110	84390	Saint-Léger-du-Ventoux
84111	84110	Saint-Marcellin-lès-Vaison
84112	84750	Saint-Martin-de-Castillon
84113	84760	Saint-Martin-de-la-Brasque
84114	84220	Saint-Pantaléon
84115	84330	Saint-Pierre-de-Vassols
84116	84110	Saint-Romain-en-Viennois
84117	84290	Saint-Roman-de-Malegarde
84118	84490	Saint-Saturnin-lès-Apt
84119	84450	Saint-Saturnin-lès-Avignon
84120	84390	Saint-Trinit
84121	84240	Sannes
84122	84260	Sarrians
84123	84390	Sault
84124	84800	Saumane-de-Vaucluse
84125	84390	Savoillan
84126	84110	Séguret
84127	84830	Sérignan-du-Comtat
84128	84400	Sivergues
84129	84700	Sorgues
84130	84190	Suzette
84131	84300	Taillades
84132	84250	Le Thor
84133	84240	La Tour-d'Aigues
84134	84850	Travaillan
84135	84100	Uchaux
84136	84190	Vacqueyras
84137	84110	Vaison-la-Romaine
84138	84600	Valréas
84140	84160	Vaugines
84141	84270	Vedène
84142	84740	Velleron
84143	84210	Venasque
84144	84750	Viens
84145	84400	Villars
84146	84110	Villedieu
84147	84530	Villelaure
84148	84570	Villes-sur-Auzon
84149	84150	Violès
84150	84820	Visan
84151	84240	Vitrolles-en-Lubéron
