= Joseph Trinquet =

- Born: June 7, 1919; Villedieu, France
- Died: August 17, 2001 (aged 82); Valréas, France
- Occupation: Sulpician priest

Academic work
- Discipline: ancient Ethiopian
- Institutions: Institut Catholique de Paris; Saint-Sulpice seminary
- Notable works: notes for Canon Osty's complete translation of the Bible

Joseph Trinquet (June 7, 1919, in Villedieu – on August 17, 2001, in Valréas) was a French Sulpician priest and professor of ancient Ethiopian at the École des Langues Orientales Anciennes of the Institut Catholique de Paris. He wrote the notes for Canon Osty's complete translation of the Bible. This translation was first published in twenty-two fascicles by Editions Rencontres in 1970, then in a single volume by Editions du Seuil in 1973.

== Biography ==
Son of a gardener and a cardboard-maker, he studied at the Valréas free school, then at the Petit and Grand Séminaires in Avignon, and later in Rome. Ordained a priest of Saint-Sulpice in 1943, he was incardinated into the Roman Catholic Archdiocese of Avignon.

From 1945 to 1985, he taught at the Saint-Sulpice seminary in Issy-les-Moulineaux.
