= Camaret =

Camaret is part of the name of two communes in France:

- Camaret-sur-Aigues, in the Vaucluse département
- Camaret-sur-Mer, in the Finistère département
