= Faucon, Vaucluse =

Faucon
- Commune
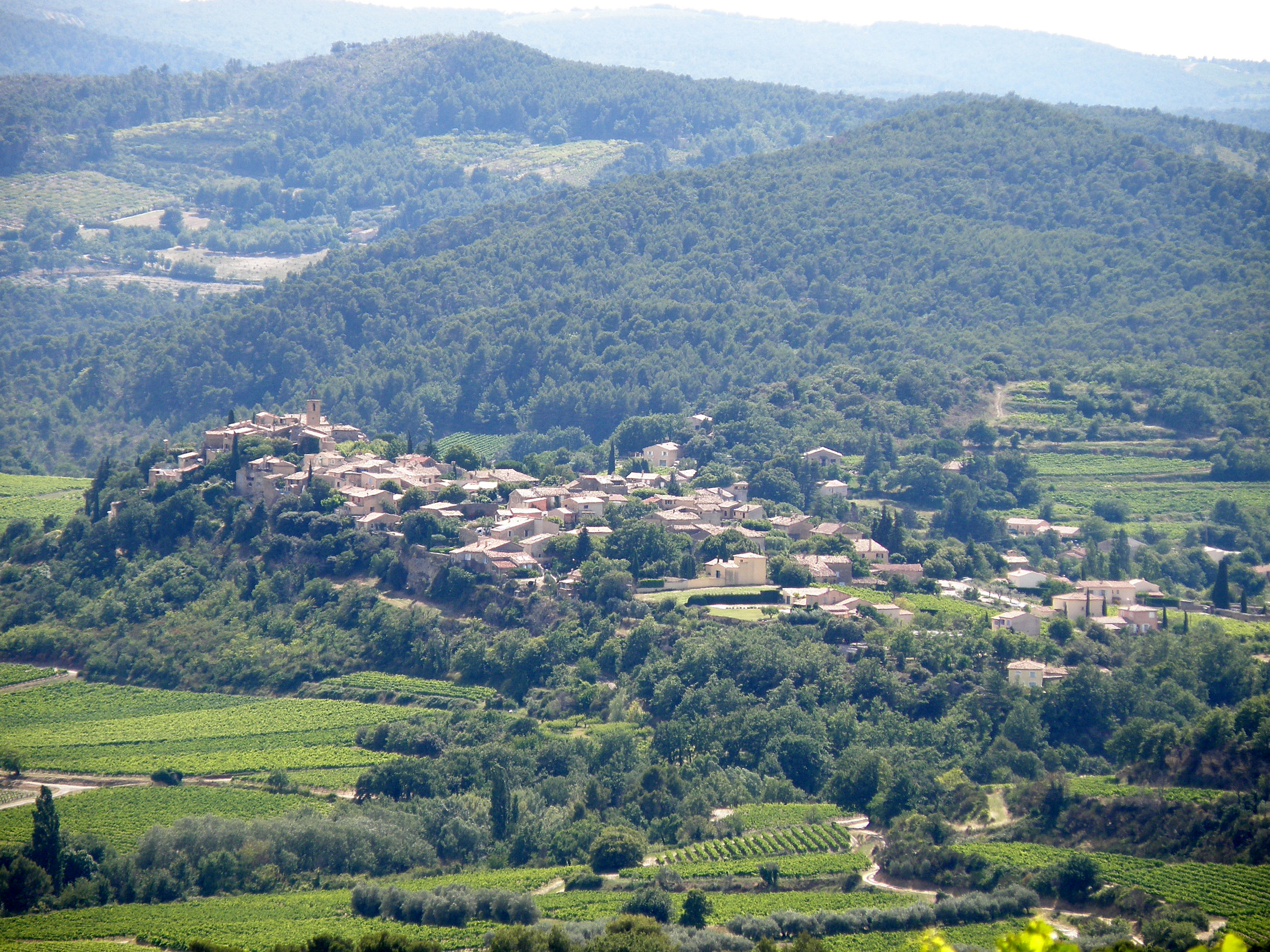
- An overall view of Faucon

- Coat of arms
- Location of Faucon
- Location within France Location within Provence-Alpes-Côte d'Azur
- Coordinates: 44°15′37″N 5°08′50″E
- Country: France
- Region: Provence-Alpes-Côte d'Azur
- Department: Vaucluse
- Arrondissement: Carpentras
- Canton: Vaison-la-Romaine

Government
  - Mayor (2020–2026): Corinne Gonny
- Area^{1}: 8.65 km^{2} (3.34 sq mi)
- Elevation: 370 m (1,210 ft)
- Highest elevation: 459 m (1,506 ft)
- Lowest elevation: 236 m (774 ft)
- Population (2023): 454
  - Density: 52.5/km^{2} (136/sq mi)
- Time zone: UTC+01:00 (CET)
  - Summer (DST): UTC+02:00 (CEST)
- INSEE/Postal code: 84045 /84110
- ^{1} French Land Register data, which excludes lakes, ponds, glaciers > 1 km^{2} (0.386 sq mi or 247 acres) and river estuaries.

Faucon (French pronunciation: [fokɔ̃]) is a commune in the Vaucluse department in the Provence-Alpes-Côte d'Azur region in southeastern France.

== See also ==
- Communes of the Vaucluse department
