= Lamotte-du-Rhône =

- Commune
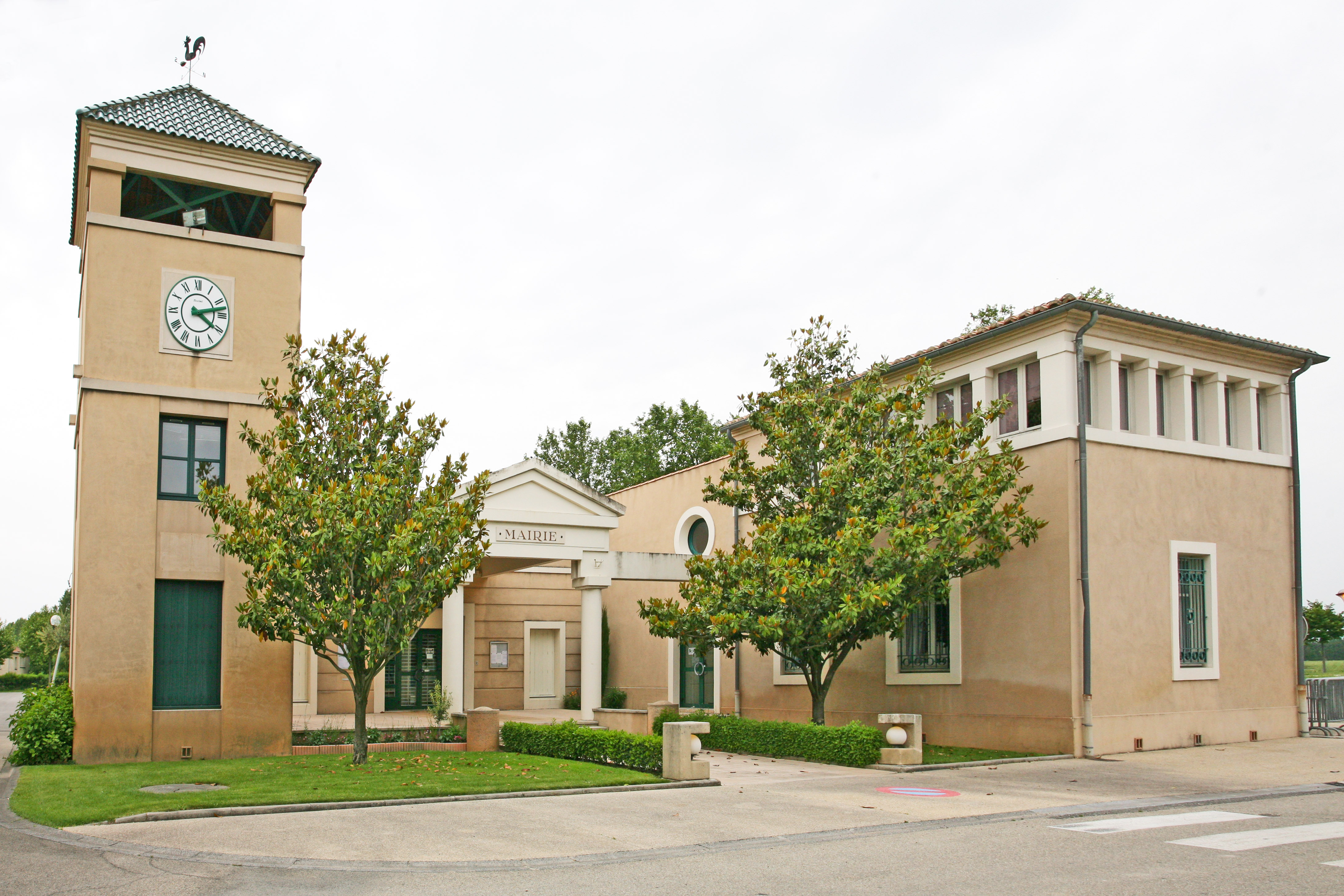
- Town hall

- Coat of arms
- Location of Lamotte-du-Rhône
- Location within France Location within Provence-Alpes-Côte d'Azur
- Coordinates: 44°16′01″N 4°40′51″E
- Country: France
- Region: Provence-Alpes-Côte d'Azur
- Department: Vaucluse
- Arrondissement: Carpentras
- Canton: Bollène
- Intercommunality: Rhône-Lez-Provence

Government
  - Mayor (2020–2026): Juan Garcia
- Area^{1}: 11.97 km^{2} (4.62 sq mi)
- Elevation: 42 m (138 ft)
- Highest elevation: 57 m (187 ft)
- Lowest elevation: 38 m (125 ft)
- Population (2023): 403
  - Density: 33.7/km^{2} (87.2/sq mi)
- Time zone: UTC+01:00 (CET)
  - Summer (DST): UTC+02:00 (CEST)
- INSEE/Postal code: 84063 /84840
- ^{1} French Land Register data, which excludes lakes, ponds, glaciers > 1 km^{2} (0.386 sq mi or 247 acres) and river estuaries.

Lamotte-du-Rhône (French pronunciation: [lamɔt dy ʁon]; Occitan: La Mota de Ròse) is a commune in the Vaucluse department in the Provence-Alpes-Côte d'Azur region in southeastern France.

== See also ==
- Communes of the Vaucluse department
