= Crestet =

- Commune
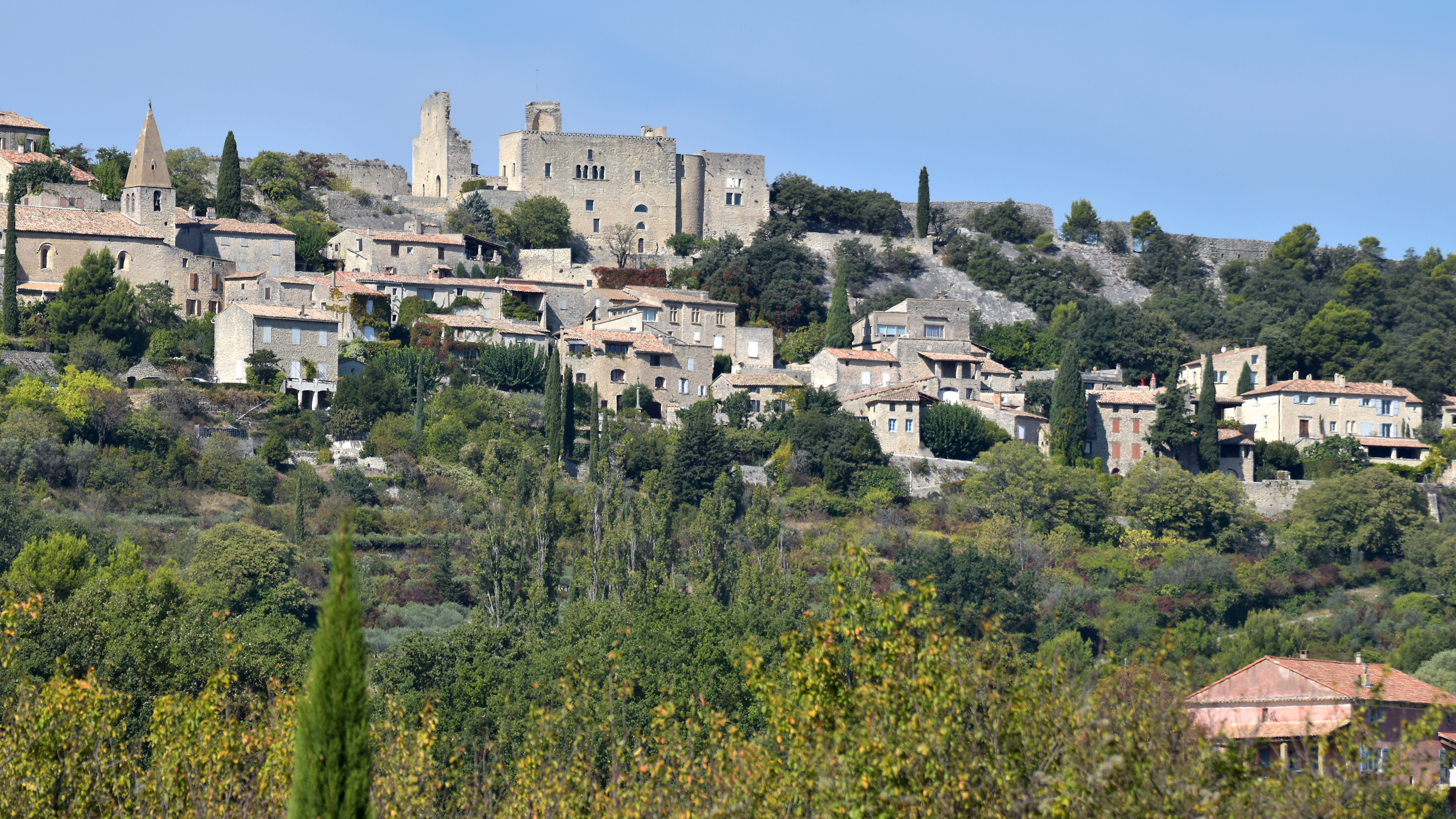
- A view of the castle of Crestet

- Coat of arms
- Location of Crestet
- Location within France Location within Provence-Alpes-Côte d'Azur
- Coordinates: 44°13′06″N 5°05′05″E
- Country: France
- Region: Provence-Alpes-Côte d'Azur
- Department: Vaucluse
- Arrondissement: Carpentras
- Canton: Vaison-la-Romaine
- Intercommunality: Vaison Ventoux

Government
  - Mayor (2020–2026): Florence Bertrand
- Area^{1}: 11.48 km^{2} (4.43 sq mi)
- Elevation: 300 m (980 ft)
- Highest elevation: 567 m (1,860 ft)
- Lowest elevation: 199 m (653 ft)
- Population (2023): 415
  - Density: 36.1/km^{2} (93.6/sq mi)
- Time zone: UTC+01:00 (CET)
  - Summer (DST): UTC+02:00 (CEST)
- INSEE/Postal code: 84040 /84110
- ^{1} French Land Register data, which excludes lakes, ponds, glaciers > 1 km^{2} (0.386 sq mi or 247 acres) and river estuaries.

Crestet (French pronunciation: [kʁɛstɛ]; Occitan: Lo Crestet) is a commune in the Vaucluse department in the Provence-Alpes-Côte d'Azur region in southeastern France.

== See also ==
- Château de Crestet
- Dentelles de Montmirail
- Communes of the Vaucluse department
