= Saint-Romain-en-Viennois =

- Commune
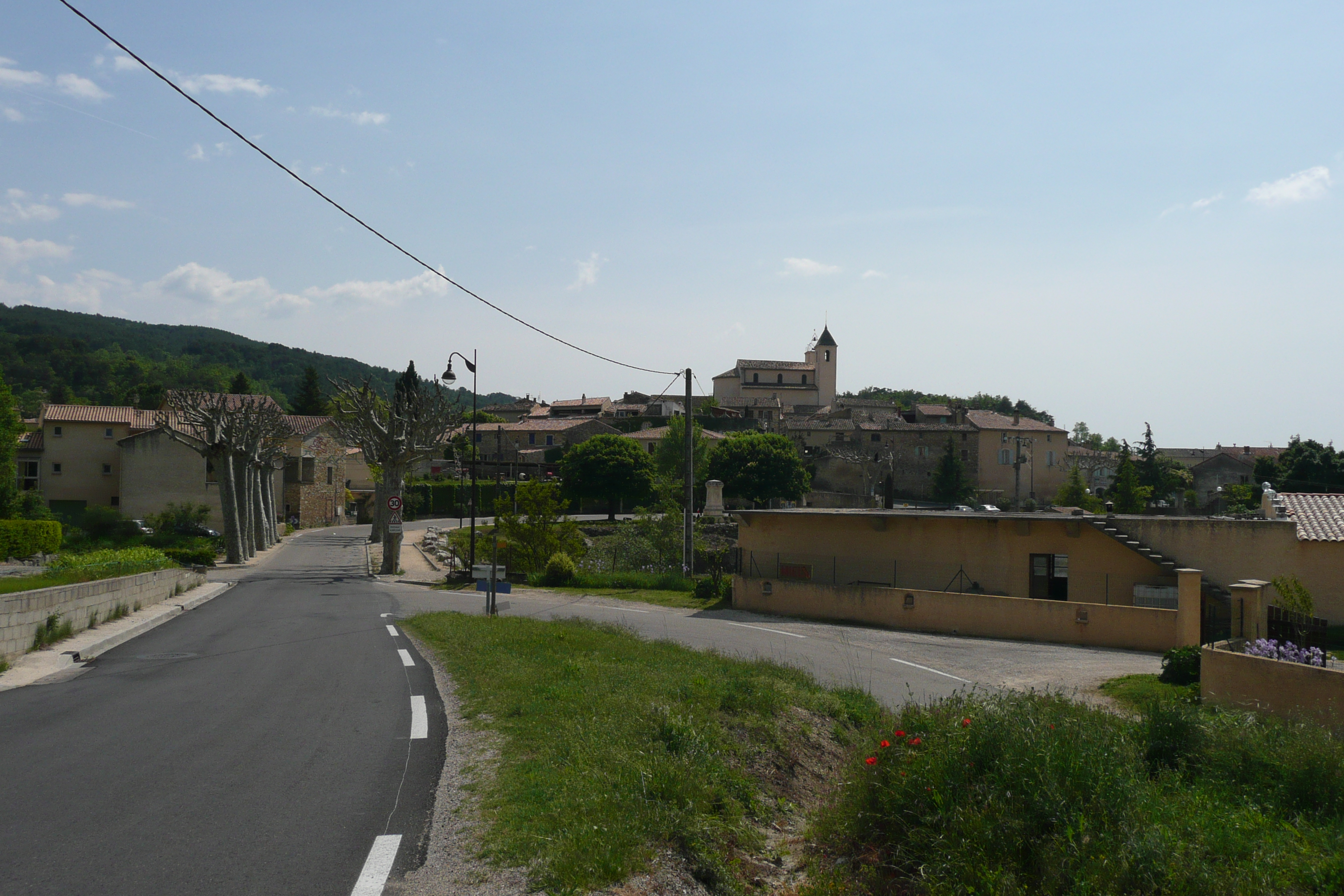
- View of Saint-Romain-en-Viennois

- Coat of arms
- Location of Saint-Romain-en-Viennois
- Location within France Location within Provence-Alpes-Côte d'Azur
- Coordinates: 44°15′32″N 5°06′37″E
- Country: France
- Region: Provence-Alpes-Côte d'Azur
- Department: Vaucluse
- Arrondissement: Carpentras
- Canton: Vaison-la-Romaine
- Intercommunality: Vaison Ventoux

Government
  - Mayor (2020–2026): Alain Bertrand
- Area^{1}: 9 km^{2} (3.5 sq mi)
- Highest elevation: 447 m (1,467 ft)
- Lowest elevation: 219 m (719 ft)
- Population (2023): 868
  - Density: 96/km^{2} (250/sq mi)
- Time zone: UTC+01:00 (CET)
  - Summer (DST): UTC+02:00 (CEST)
- INSEE/Postal code: 84116 /84110
- ^{1} French Land Register data, which excludes lakes, ponds, glaciers > 1 km^{2} (0.386 sq mi or 247 acres) and river estuaries.

Saint-Romain-en-Viennois (Occitan: Sant Roman dins Viena) is a commune in the Vaucluse department in the Provence-Alpes-Côte d'Azur region in southeastern France.

== See also ==
- Communes of the Vaucluse department
