= Malemort-du-Comtat =

- Commune
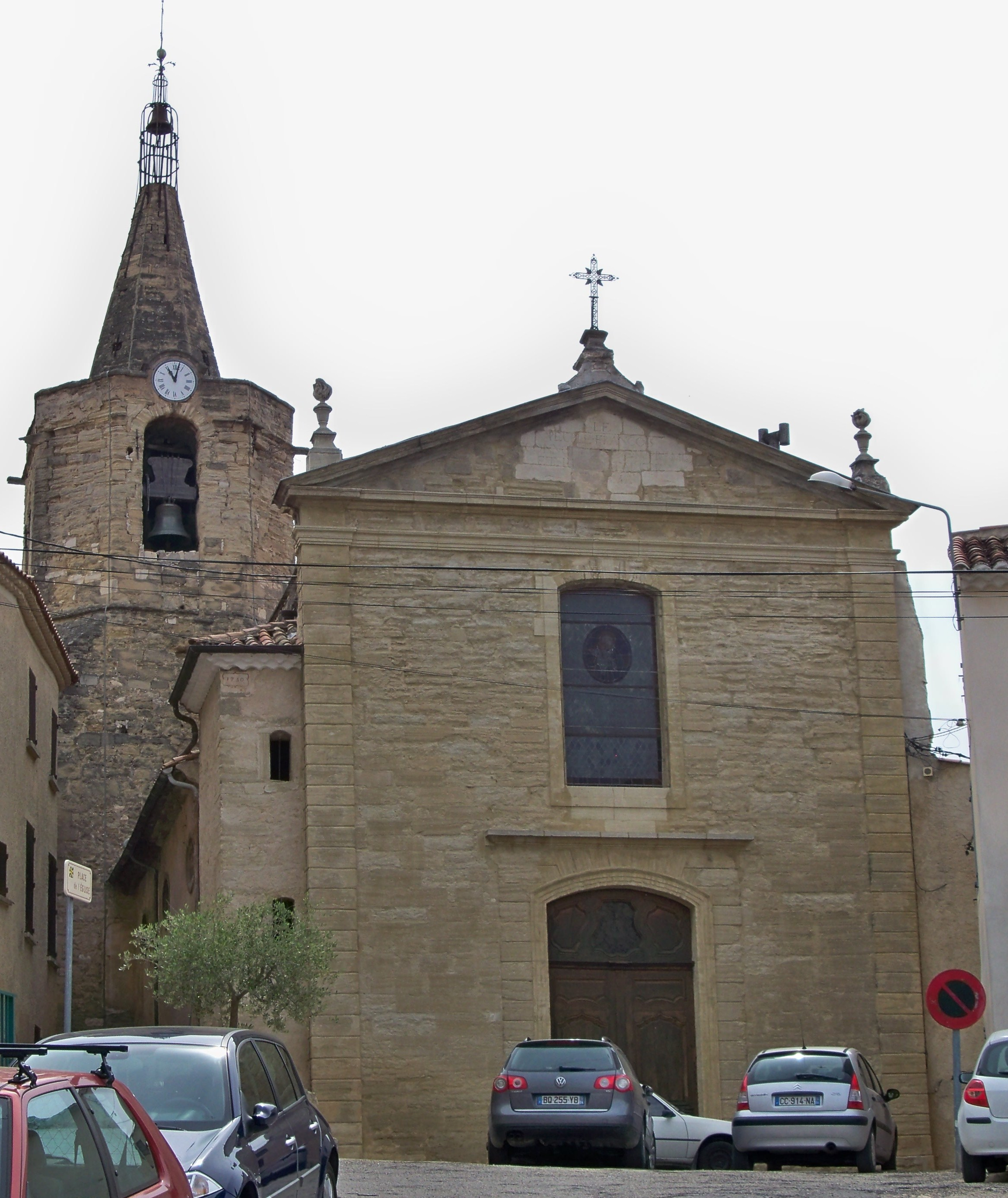
- The church of Malemort du Comtat

- Coat of arms
- Location of Malemort-du-Comtat
- Location within France Location within Provence-Alpes-Côte d'Azur
- Coordinates: 44°01′18″N 5°09′37″E
- Country: France
- Region: Provence-Alpes-Côte d'Azur
- Department: Vaucluse
- Arrondissement: Carpentras
- Canton: Pernes-les-Fontaines

Government
  - Mayor (2020–2026): Ghislain Roux
- Area^{1}: 11.92 km^{2} (4.60 sq mi)
- Elevation: 208 m (682 ft)
- Highest elevation: 364 m (1,194 ft)
- Lowest elevation: 160 m (520 ft)
- Population (2023): 1,969
  - Density: 165.2/km^{2} (427.8/sq mi)
- Time zone: UTC+01:00 (CET)
  - Summer (DST): UTC+02:00 (CEST)
- INSEE/Postal code: 84070 /84570
- ^{1} French Land Register data, which excludes lakes, ponds, glaciers > 1 km^{2} (0.386 sq mi or 247 acres) and river estuaries.

Malemort-du-Comtat (French pronunciation: [malmɔʁ dy kɔ̃ta]; Occitan: Malamòrt de la Comtat) is a commune in the Vaucluse department in the Provence-Alpes-Côte d'Azur region in southeastern France.

== See also ==
- Communes of the Vaucluse department
