= Puyméras =

- Commune
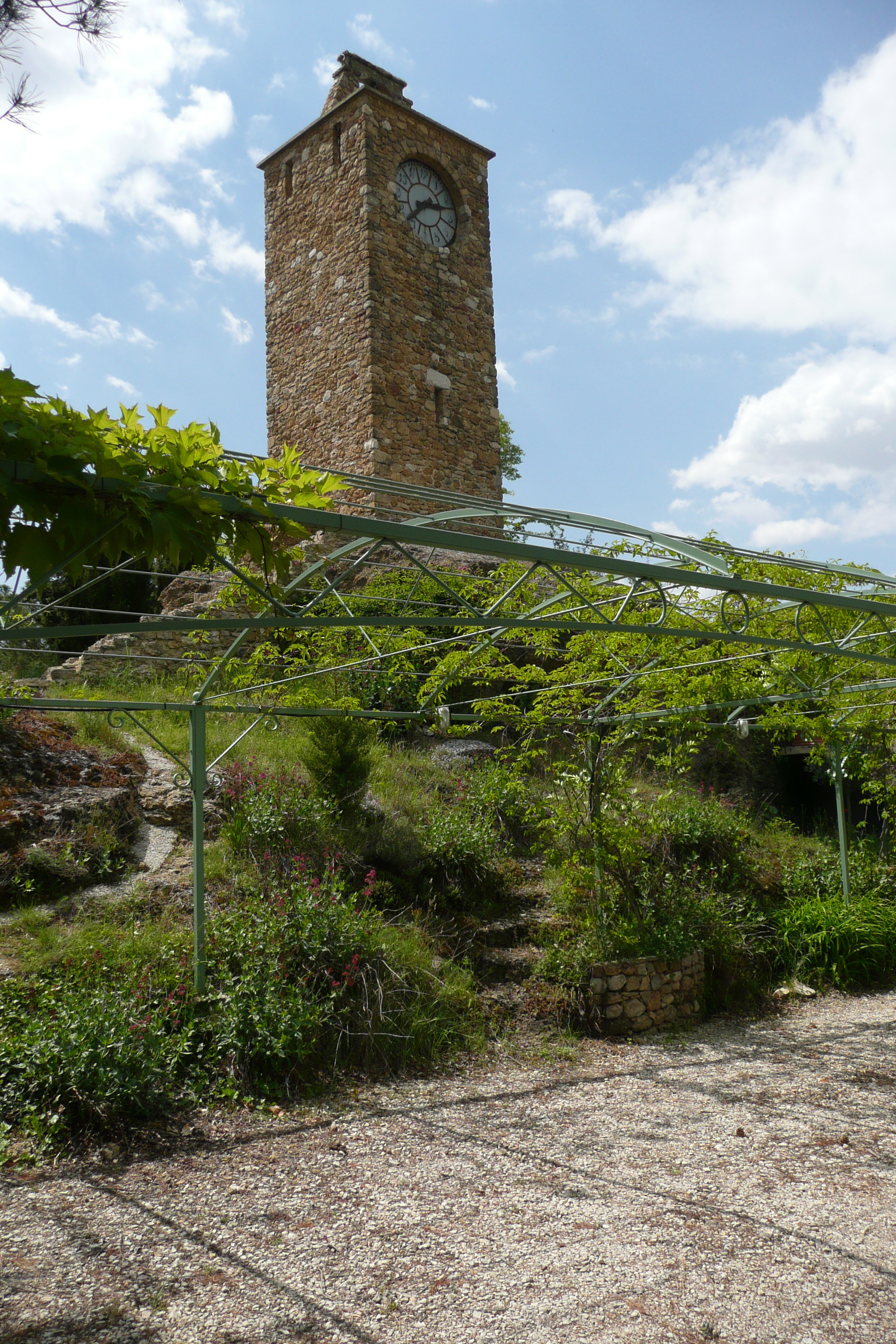
- The clock tower in Puyméras

- Coat of arms
- Location of Puyméras
- Location within France Location within Provence-Alpes-Côte d'Azur
- Coordinates: 44°16′14″N 5°07′44″E
- Country: France
- Region: Provence-Alpes-Côte d'Azur
- Department: Vaucluse
- Arrondissement: Carpentras
- Canton: Vaison-la-Romaine
- Intercommunality: Vaison Ventoux

Government
  - Mayor (2020–2026): Roger Trappo
- Area^{1}: 14.59 km^{2} (5.63 sq mi)
- Elevation: 372 m (1,220 ft)
- Highest elevation: 846 m (2,776 ft)
- Lowest elevation: 275 m (902 ft)
- Population (2023): 585
  - Density: 40.1/km^{2} (104/sq mi)
- Time zone: UTC+01:00 (CET)
  - Summer (DST): UTC+02:00 (CEST)
- INSEE/Postal code: 84094 /84110
- ^{1} French Land Register data, which excludes lakes, ponds, glaciers > 1 km^{2} (0.386 sq mi or 247 acres) and river estuaries.

Puyméras (French pronunciation: [pɥimeʁa]; Occitan: Puègmeiràs) is a commune in the Vaucluse department in the Provence-Alpes-Côte d'Azur region in southeastern France.

== Main sights ==
- Church of St. Michael, originally built in Romanesque style
- Clock Tower, remade in the 18th century
- Castle, ruined during the French Revolution
- 14th century defensive walls, with a circular tower near the Sabrun Gate

== See also ==
- Communes of the Vaucluse department
