= Roaix =

- Commune
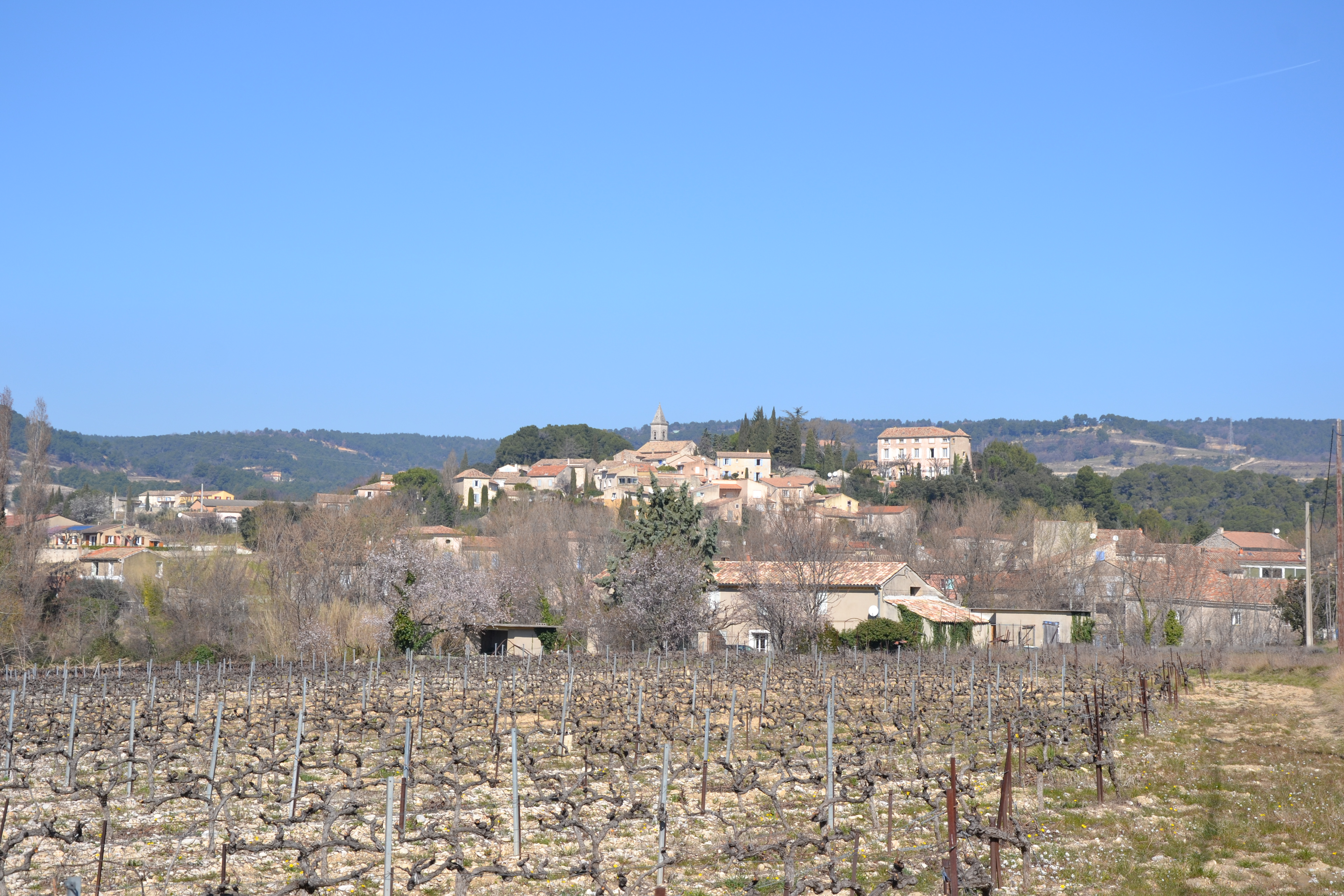
- View of Roaix

- Coat of arms
- Location of Roaix
- Location within France Location within Provence-Alpes-Côte d'Azur
- Coordinates: 44°14′43″N 5°00′52″E
- Country: France
- Region: Provence-Alpes-Côte d'Azur
- Department: Vaucluse
- Arrondissement: Carpentras
- Canton: Vaison-la-Romaine
- Area^{1}: 5.83 km^{2} (2.25 sq mi)
- Elevation: 168 m (551 ft)
- Highest elevation: 384 m (1,260 ft)
- Lowest elevation: 149 m (489 ft)
- Population (2023): 626
  - Density: 107/km^{2} (278/sq mi)
- Time zone: UTC+01:00 (CET)
  - Summer (DST): UTC+02:00 (CEST)
- INSEE/Postal code: 84098 /84110
- ^{1} French Land Register data, which excludes lakes, ponds, glaciers > 1 km^{2} (0.386 sq mi or 247 acres) and river estuaries.

Roaix (French pronunciation: [ʁɔɛks]; Occitan: Roais) is a commune in the Vaucluse department in the Provence-Alpes-Côte d'Azur region in southeastern France.

Alice Colonieu lived at Roaix.

== See also ==
- Communes of the Vaucluse department
