= Séguret =

Séguret Seguret (Occitan)
- Commune
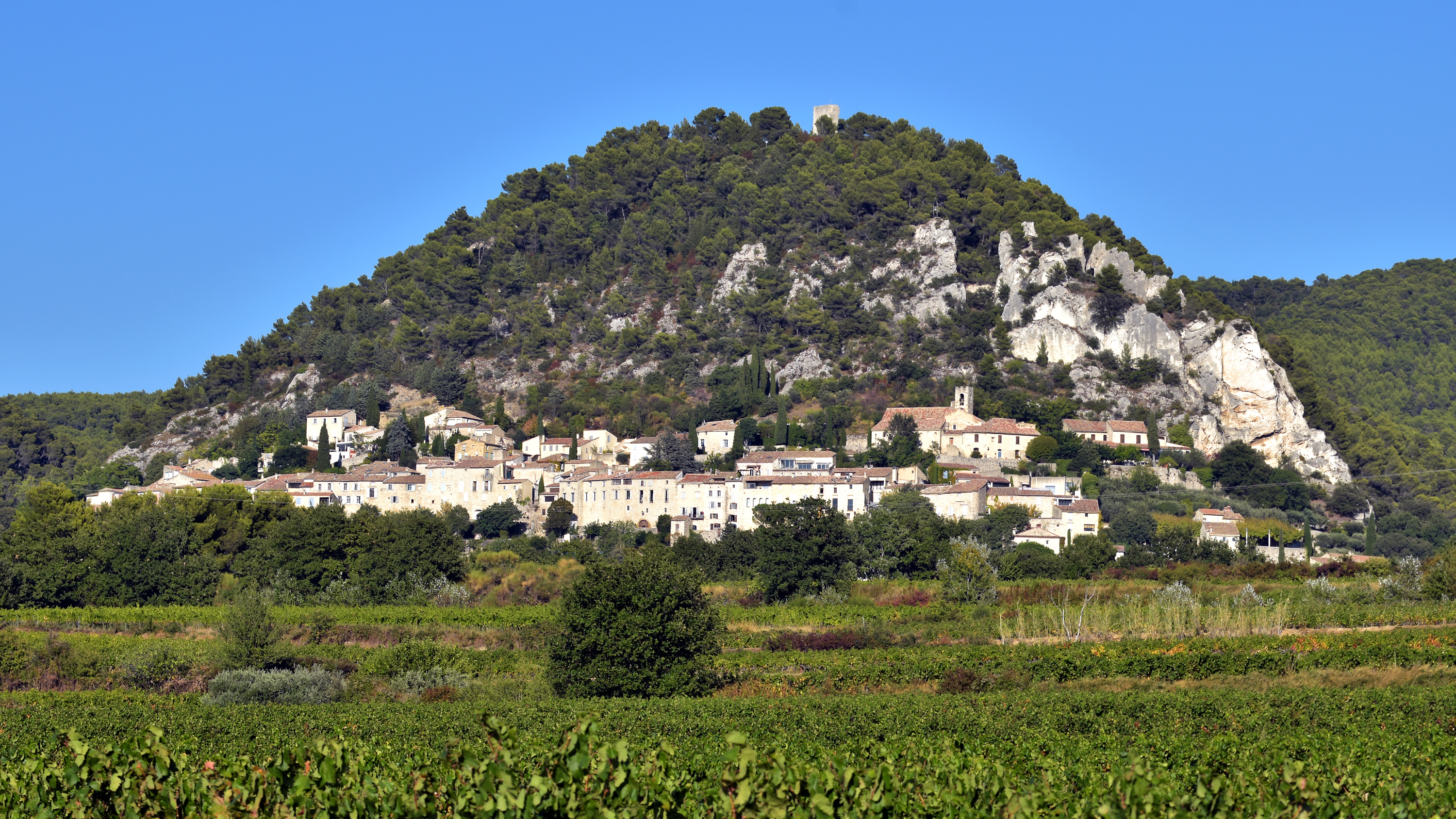
- The village of Séguret and the vineyard

- Coat of arms
- Location of Séguret
- Location within France Location within Provence-Alpes-Côte d'Azur
- Coordinates: 44°12′22″N 5°01′25″E
- Country: France
- Region: Provence-Alpes-Côte d'Azur
- Department: Vaucluse
- Arrondissement: Carpentras
- Canton: Vaison-la-Romaine
- Intercommunality: CC Vaison Ventoux

Government
  - Mayor (2020–2026): Brice Criquillon
- Area^{1}: 21.04 km^{2} (8.12 sq mi)
- Elevation: 250 m (820 ft)
- Highest elevation: 513 m (1,683 ft)
- Lowest elevation: 125 m (410 ft)
- Population (2023): 769
  - Density: 36.5/km^{2} (94.7/sq mi)
- Demonym: Ségurétains
- Time zone: UTC+01:00 (CET)
  - Summer (DST): UTC+02:00 (CEST)
- INSEE/Postal code: 84126 /84110
- Website: village-seguret.fr
- ^{1} French Land Register data, which excludes lakes, ponds, glaciers > 1 km^{2} (0.386 sq mi or 247 acres) and river estuaries.

Séguret (French pronunciation: [seɡyʁɛ]; Occitan: Seguret) is a commune in the Vaucluse department in the Provence-Alpes-Côte d'Azur region in Southeastern France. As of 2023, the population of the commune was 769. It is a member of Les Plus Beaux Villages de France (The Most Beautiful Villages of France) Association.

== See also ==
- Communes of the Vaucluse department
