= Saint-Roman-de-Malegarde =

- Commune
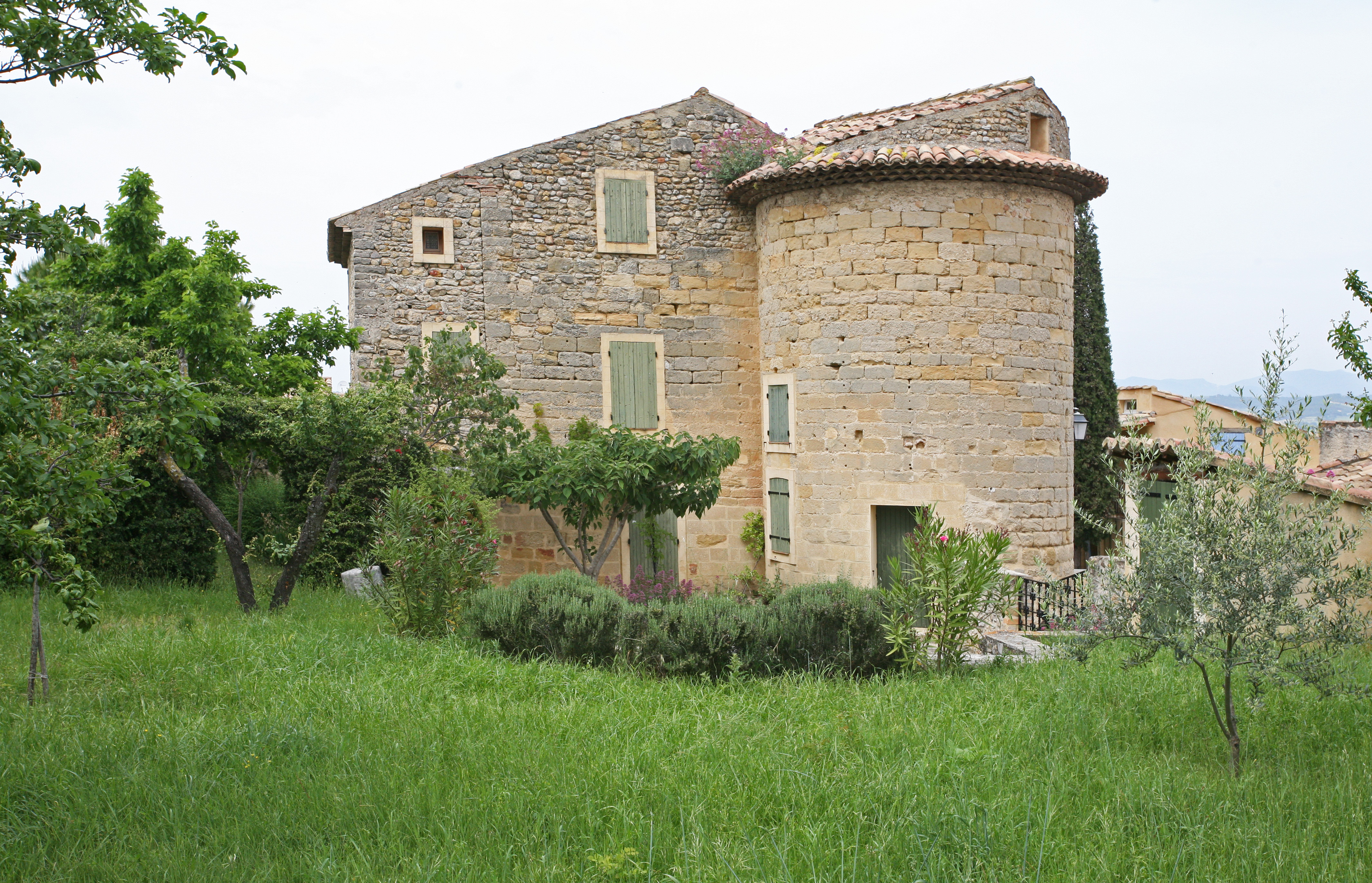
- Buildings in the heights of Saint-Roman-de-Malegarde

- Coat of arms
- Location of Saint-Roman-de-Malegarde
- Location within France Location within Provence-Alpes-Côte d'Azur
- Coordinates: 44°16′16″N 4°57′50″E
- Country: France
- Region: Provence-Alpes-Côte d'Azur
- Department: Vaucluse
- Arrondissement: Carpentras
- Canton: Vaison-la-Romaine

Government
  - Mayor (2020–2026): Marie-Claire Michel
- Area^{1}: 8.21 km^{2} (3.17 sq mi)
- Elevation: 200 m (660 ft)
- Highest elevation: 366 m (1,201 ft)
- Lowest elevation: 125 m (410 ft)
- Population (2023): 339
  - Density: 41.3/km^{2} (107/sq mi)
- Time zone: UTC+01:00 (CET)
  - Summer (DST): UTC+02:00 (CEST)
- INSEE/Postal code: 84117 /84290
- ^{1} French Land Register data, which excludes lakes, ponds, glaciers > 1 km^{2} (0.386 sq mi or 247 acres) and river estuaries.

Saint-Roman-de-Malegarde (French pronunciation: [sɛ̃ ʁɔmɑ̃ də malɡaʁd]; Occitan: Sant Roman de Malagarda) is a commune in the Vaucluse department in the Provence-Alpes-Côte d'Azur region in southeastern France.

== Geography ==
On the edge of the Vaucluse, looking onto the border with the Drôme and dozing between Bollène and Vaison-la-Romaine, Saint-Romain-de-Malegarde is a former outpost of the order of the Knights Templar, built on the left bank of the Aygues on the northern border of the Comtat Venaissin.

== Features ==
The top of the old village is built on a hill, where the streets are steep and narrow. The bottom of the village has absorbed new buildings such as the school and the mairie (town hall). Its parish church in the centre of the village dates back to the 13th century. Its façade is decorated with an 18th-century sundial and a Maltese cross. There is also the remains of an ancient 12th-century château. All that remains is three towers. The middle one is a troglodyte part of the former fortress.

== Economy ==
Only a few hundred people live in the village all year round. Most of the inhabitants are wine-growers and cultivate appellation d'origine contrôlée (AOC) Côtes du Rhône vineyards.

== See also ==
- Communes of the Vaucluse department
