= Modène =

- Commune
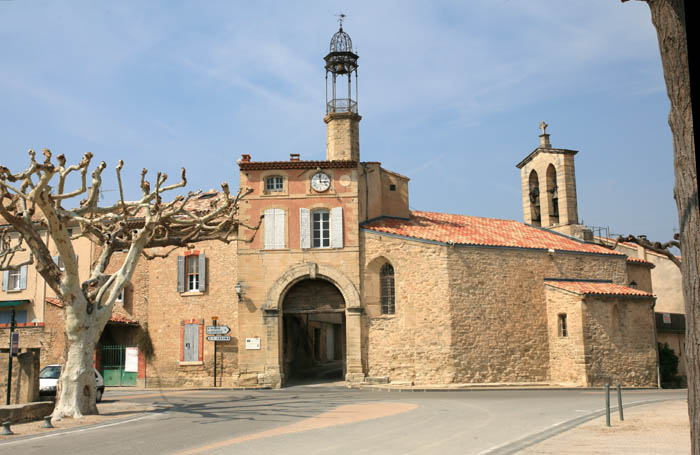
- A view within the village of Modène

- Coat of arms
- Location of Modène
- Location within France Location within Provence-Alpes-Côte d'Azur
- Coordinates: 44°06′15″N 5°07′25″E
- Country: France
- Region: Provence-Alpes-Côte d'Azur
- Department: Vaucluse
- Arrondissement: Carpentras
- Canton: Pernes-les-Fontaines
- Intercommunality: CA Ventoux-Comtat Venaissin

Government
  - Mayor (2020–2026): Norbert Lepatre
- Area^{1}: 4.73 km^{2} (1.83 sq mi)
- Elevation: 300 m (980 ft)
- Highest elevation: 409 m (1,342 ft)
- Lowest elevation: 164 m (538 ft)
- Population (2023): 458
  - Density: 96.8/km^{2} (251/sq mi)
- Time zone: UTC+01:00 (CET)
  - Summer (DST): UTC+02:00 (CEST)
- INSEE/Postal code: 84077 /84330
- ^{1} French Land Register data, which excludes lakes, ponds, glaciers > 1 km^{2} (0.386 sq mi or 247 acres) and river estuaries.

Modène (French pronunciation: [mɔdɛn]; Occitan: Maudena) is a commune in the Vaucluse department in the Provence-Alpes-Côte d'Azur region in southeastern France.

== See also ==
- Communes of the Vaucluse department
