= Saint-Marcellin-lès-Vaison =

- Commune
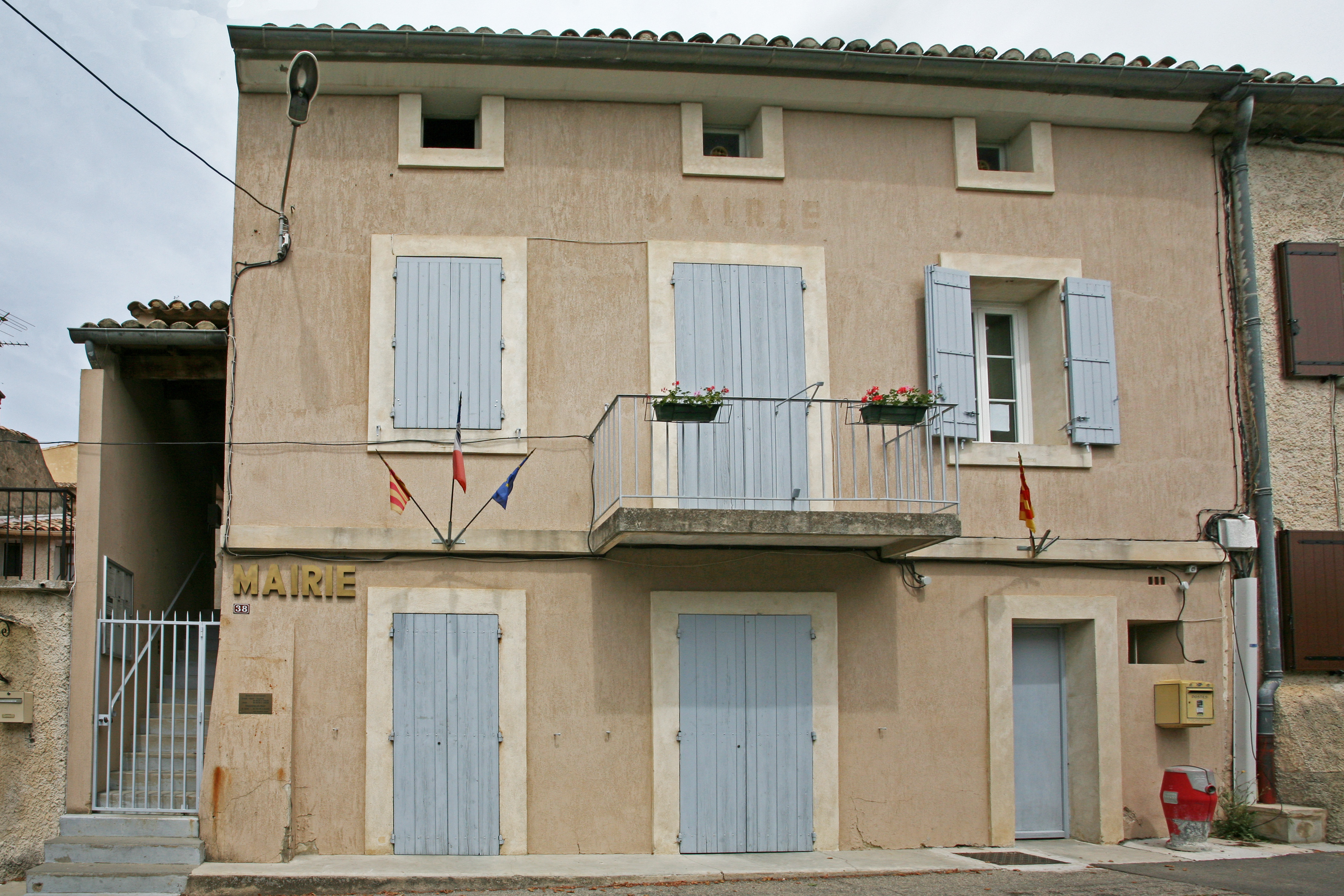
- Town hall

- Coat of arms
- Location of Saint-Marcellin-lès-Vaison
- Location within France Location within Provence-Alpes-Côte d'Azur
- Coordinates: 44°13′52″N 5°05′57″E
- Country: France
- Region: Provence-Alpes-Côte d'Azur
- Department: Vaucluse
- Arrondissement: Carpentras
- Canton: Vaison-la-Romaine
- Intercommunality: Vaison Ventoux

Government
  - Mayor (2020–2026): Gérard Raineri
- Area^{1}: 3.56 km^{2} (1.37 sq mi)
- Elevation: 287 m (942 ft)
- Highest elevation: 444 m (1,457 ft)
- Lowest elevation: 200 m (660 ft)
- Population (2023): 334
  - Density: 93.8/km^{2} (243/sq mi)
- Time zone: UTC+01:00 (CET)
  - Summer (DST): UTC+02:00 (CEST)
- INSEE/Postal code: 84111 /84110
- ^{1} French Land Register data, which excludes lakes, ponds, glaciers > 1 km^{2} (0.386 sq mi or 247 acres) and river estuaries.

Saint-Marcellin-lès-Vaison (French pronunciation: [sɛ̃ maʁsəlɛ̃ lɛ vɛzɔ̃], literally Saint-Marcellin near Vaison; Provençal: Sant Marcelin de Vaison) is a commune in the Vaucluse department in the Provence-Alpes-Côte d'Azur region in southeastern France.

== See also ==
- Communes of the Vaucluse department
