= Communauté d'agglomération Ventoux-Comtat Venaissin =

Ventoux-Comtat Venaissin
- Communauté d'agglomération
- Interactive map of Ventoux-Comtat Venaissin
- Coordinates: 44°06′N 05°07′E
- Country: France
- Region: Provence-Alpes-Côte d'Azur
- Department: Vaucluse
- No. of communes: {{{nbcomm}}}
- Established: 2003
- Area: 511.6 km^{2} (197.5 sq mi)
- Population (2019): 70,298
  - Density: 137.4/km^{2} (355.9/sq mi)
- Website: www.lacove.fr

Communauté d'agglomération Ventoux-Comtat Venaissin is the communauté d'agglomération, an intercommunal structure, centred on the town of Carpentras. It is located in the Vaucluse department, in the Provence-Alpes-Côte d'Azur region, southeastern France. Created in 2003, its seat is in Carpentras. Its name refers to the Mont Ventoux and the Comtat Venaissin. Its area is 511.6 km^{2}. Its population was 70,298 in 2019, of which 29,236 in Carpentras proper.

== Composition ==
The communauté d'agglomération consists of the following 25 communes:

1. Aubignan
2. Le Barroux
3. Le Beaucet
4. Beaumes-de-Venise
5. Beaumont-du-Ventoux
6. Bédoin
7. Caromb
8. Carpentras
9. Crillon-le-Brave
10. Flassan
11. Gigondas
12. Lafare
13. Loriol-du-Comtat
14. Malaucène
15. Mazan
16. Modène
17. La Roque-Alric
18. La Roque-sur-Pernes
19. Saint-Didier
20. Saint-Hippolyte-le-Graveyron
21. Saint-Pierre-de-Vassols
22. Sarrians
23. Suzette
24. Vacqueyras
25. Venasque
