= Caromb =

- Commune
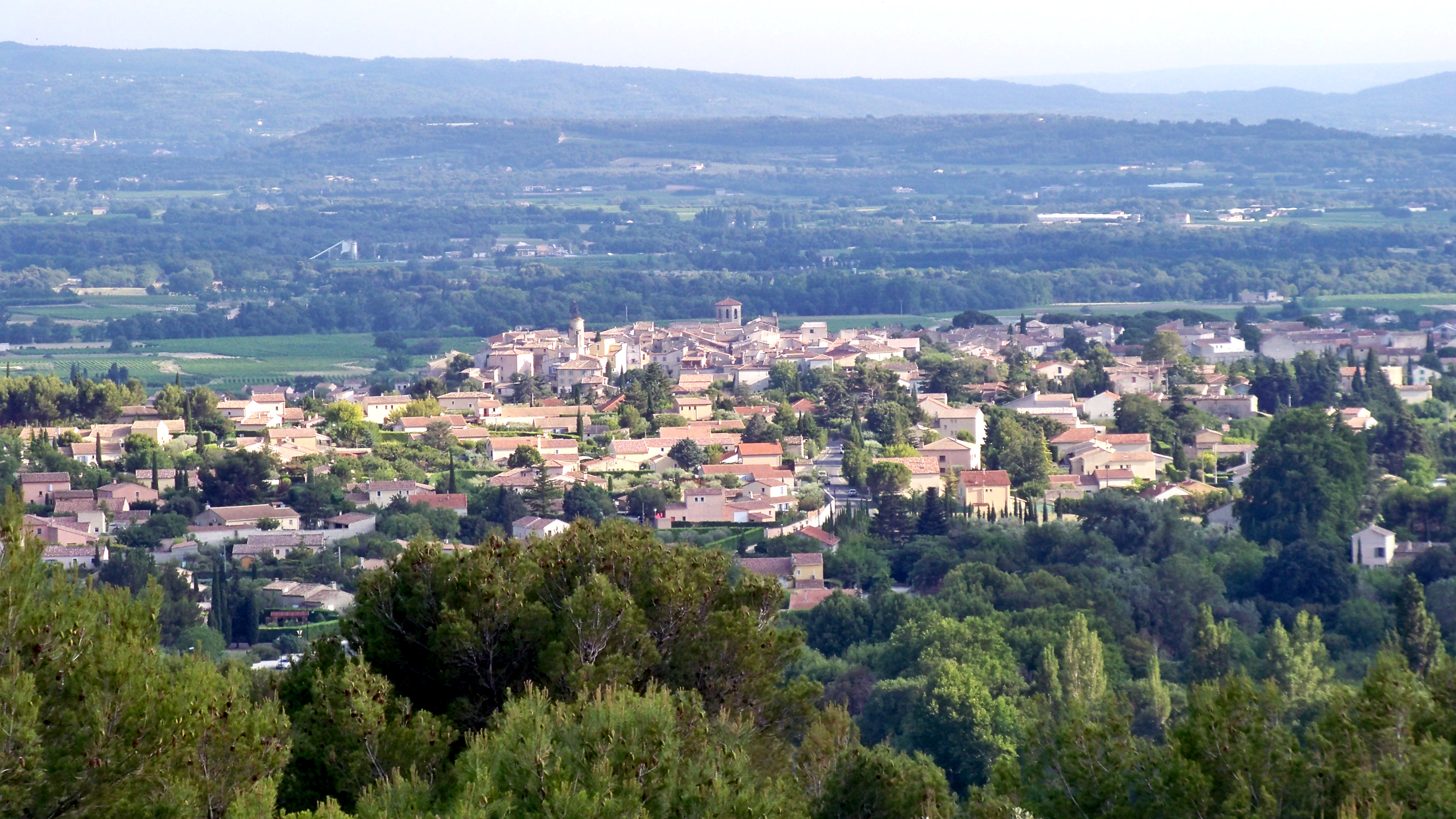
- A view of Caromb from Montmirail

- Coat of arms
- Location of Caromb
- Location within France Location within Provence-Alpes-Côte d'Azur
- Coordinates: 44°06′43″N 5°06′30″E
- Country: France
- Region: Provence-Alpes-Côte d'Azur
- Department: Vaucluse
- Arrondissement: Carpentras
- Canton: Monteux
- Intercommunality: CA Ventoux-Comtat Venaissin

Government
  - Mayor (2020–2026): Valérie Michelier
- Area^{1}: 17.98 km^{2} (6.94 sq mi)
- Elevation: 185 m (607 ft)
- Highest elevation: 453 m (1,486 ft)
- Lowest elevation: 129 m (423 ft)
- Population (2023): 3,479
  - Density: 193.5/km^{2} (501.1/sq mi)
- Time zone: UTC+01:00 (CET)
  - Summer (DST): UTC+02:00 (CEST)
- INSEE/Postal code: 84030 /84330
- ^{1} French Land Register data, which excludes lakes, ponds, glaciers > 1 km^{2} (0.386 sq mi or 247 acres) and river estuaries.

Caromb (French pronunciation: [kaʁɔ̃]) is a commune in the Vaucluse department in the Provence-Alpes-Côte d'Azur region in southeastern France.

== Population ==
Historical population
Year	Pop.	±% p.a.
1968	1,901	—
1975	2,114	+1.53%
1982	2,266	+1.00%
1990	2,640	+1.93%
1999	3,117	+1.86%
2007	3,186	+0.27%
2012	3,171	−0.09%
2017	3,348	+1.09%
2023	3,479	+0.64%
Source: INSEE

== See also ==
- Communes of the Vaucluse department
