= Entrechaux =

- Commune
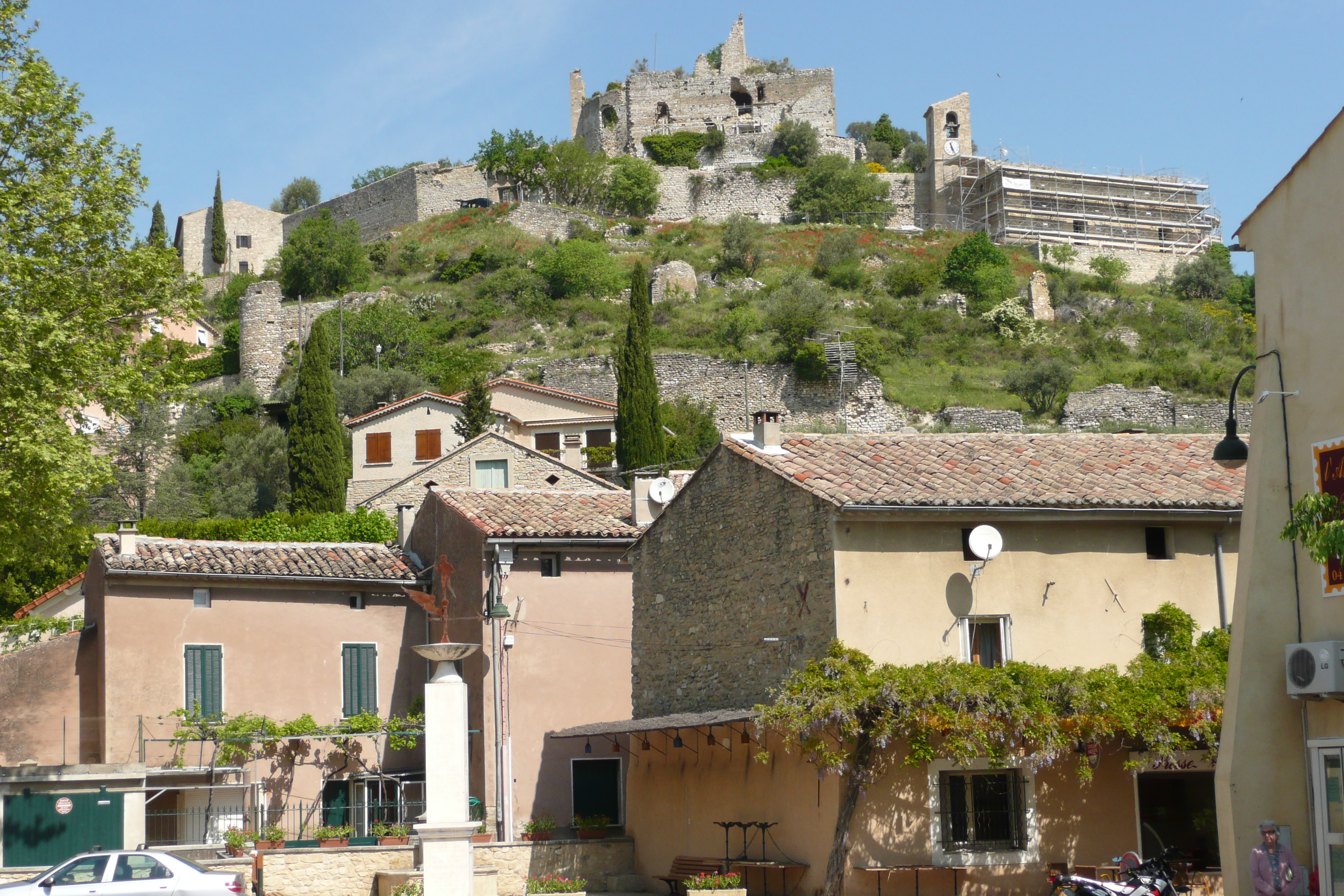
- Buildings in Entrechaux

- Coat of arms
- Location of Entrechaux
- Location within France Location within Provence-Alpes-Côte d'Azur
- Coordinates: 44°13′07″N 5°08′19″E
- Country: France
- Region: Provence-Alpes-Côte d'Azur
- Department: Vaucluse
- Arrondissement: Carpentras
- Canton: Vaison-la-Romaine
- Intercommunality: Vaison Ventoux

Government
  - Mayor (2020–2026): Alexandre Roux
- Area^{1}: 14.91 km^{2} (5.76 sq mi)
- Elevation: 284 m (932 ft)
- Highest elevation: 463 m (1,519 ft)
- Lowest elevation: 210 m (690 ft)
- Population (2023): 1,177
  - Density: 78.94/km^{2} (204.5/sq mi)
- Time zone: UTC+01:00 (CET)
  - Summer (DST): UTC+02:00 (CEST)
- INSEE/Postal code: 84044 /84340
- ^{1} French Land Register data, which excludes lakes, ponds, glaciers > 1 km^{2} (0.386 sq mi or 247 acres) and river estuaries.

Entrechaux (French pronunciation: [ɑ̃tʁəʃo]; Occitan: Entrechaums) is a commune in the Vaucluse department in the Provence-Alpes-Côte d'Azur region in southeastern France.

== Sights and monuments ==
- Château d'Entrechaux, 10th-11th-century castle ruins, open to visitors in summer.

== See also ==
- Communes of the Vaucluse department
