= Saint-Hippolyte-le-Graveyron =

- Commune
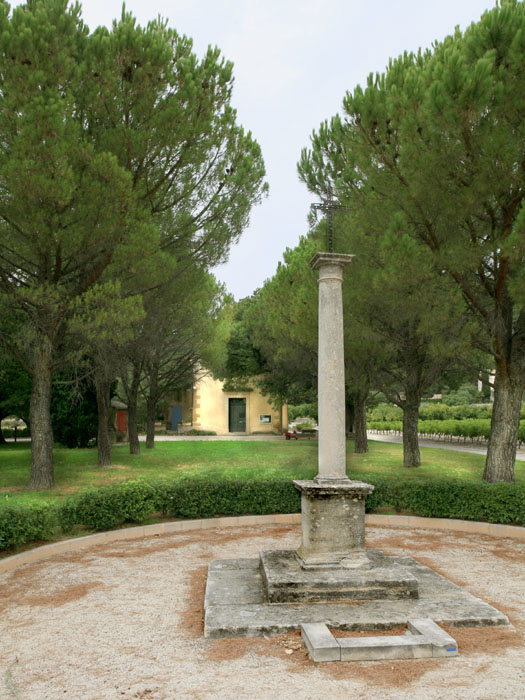
- Column with a cross at the centre of the village

- Coat of arms
- Location of Saint-Hippolyte-le-Graveyron
- Location within France Location within Provence-Alpes-Côte d'Azur
- Coordinates: 44°07′25″N 5°04′30″E
- Country: France
- Region: Provence-Alpes-Côte d'Azur
- Department: Vaucluse
- Arrondissement: Carpentras
- Canton: Monteux
- Intercommunality: CA Ventoux-Comtat Venaissin
- Area^{1}: 4.94 km^{2} (1.91 sq mi)
- Elevation: 170 m (560 ft)
- Highest elevation: 438 m (1,437 ft)
- Lowest elevation: 135 m (443 ft)
- Population (2023): 168
  - Density: 34.0/km^{2} (88.1/sq mi)
- Time zone: UTC+01:00 (CET)
  - Summer (DST): UTC+02:00 (CEST)
- INSEE/Postal code: 84109 /84330
- ^{1} French Land Register data, which excludes lakes, ponds, glaciers > 1 km^{2} (0.386 sq mi or 247 acres) and river estuaries.

Saint-Hippolyte-le-Graveyron (French pronunciation: [sɛ̃.t‿ipɔlit lə ɡʁaveʁɔ̃]; Provençal: Sant Ipolite lo Graveiron) is a commune in the Vaucluse department in the Provence-Alpes-Côte d'Azur region in southeastern France.

== Sites and Monuments ==
- Stone column topped by an iron cross.
- Chateau Juvenal 19th century
- Parish church, built in 1830, land donated by a former mayor Hypolite Fabre.

== See also ==
- Communes of the Vaucluse department
