= Loriol-du-Comtat =

Loriol-du-Comtat L'Auriòu de la Comtat (Occitan)
- Commune
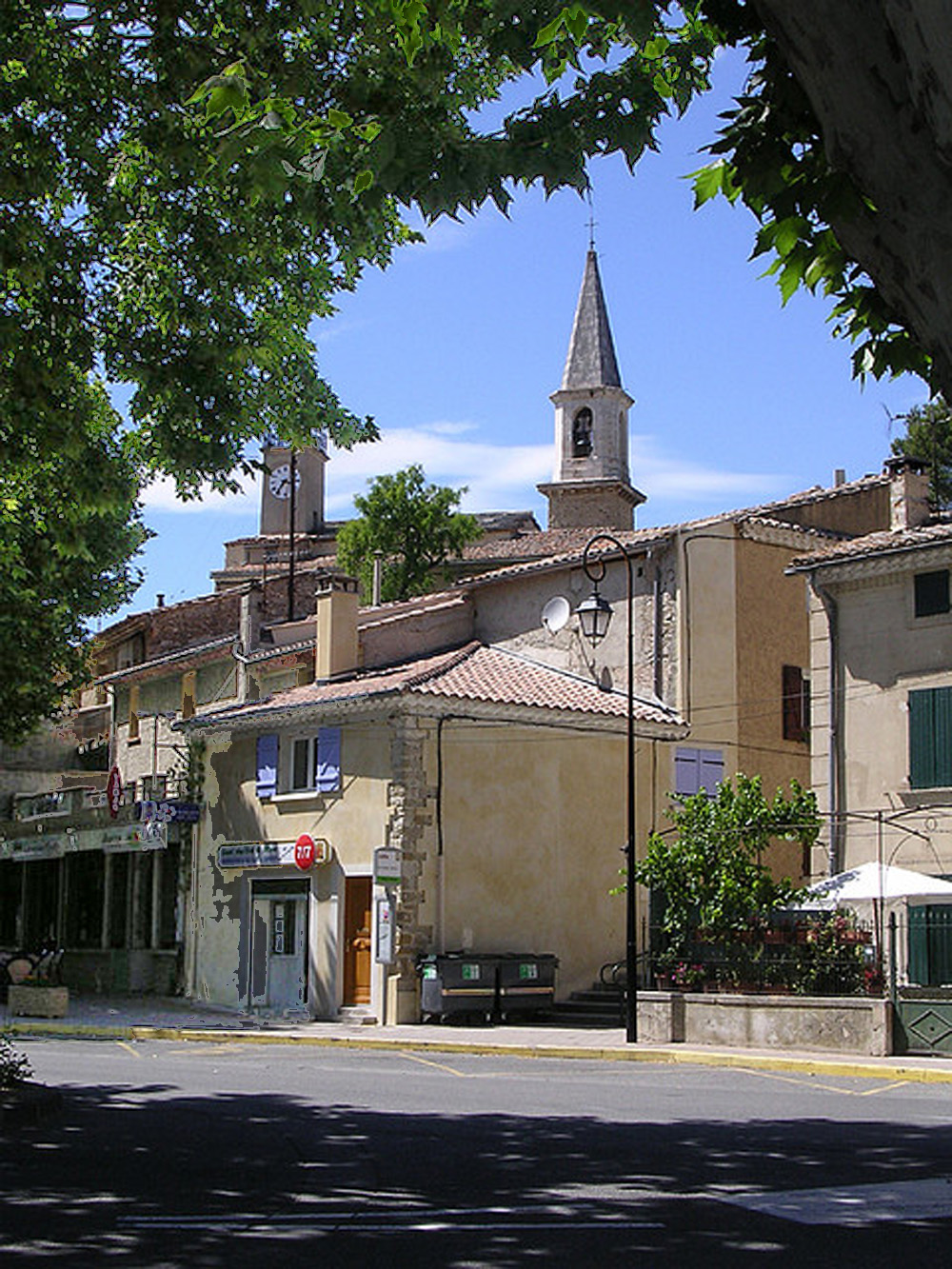
- The centre of the village of Loriol-du-Comtat

- Coat of arms
- Location of Loriol-du-Comtat
- Location within France Location within Provence-Alpes-Côte d'Azur
- Coordinates: 44°04′38″N 5°00′05″E
- Country: France
- Region: Provence-Alpes-Côte d'Azur
- Department: Vaucluse
- Arrondissement: Carpentras
- Canton: Carpentras
- Intercommunality: CA Ventoux-Comtat Venaissin

Government
  - Mayor (2020–2026): Gérard Borgo
- Area^{1}: 11.29 km^{2} (4.36 sq mi)
- Elevation: 65 m (213 ft)
- Highest elevation: 93 m (305 ft)
- Lowest elevation: 31 m (102 ft)
- Population (2023): 2,486
  - Density: 220.2/km^{2} (570.3/sq mi)
- Time zone: UTC+01:00 (CET)
  - Summer (DST): UTC+02:00 (CEST)
- INSEE/Postal code: 84067 /84870
- ^{1} French Land Register data, which excludes lakes, ponds, glaciers > 1 km^{2} (0.386 sq mi or 247 acres) and river estuaries.

Loriol-du-Comtat (French pronunciation: [lɔʁjɔl dy kɔ̃ta]; Occitan: L'Auriòu de la Comtat) is a commune in the Vaucluse department in the Provence-Alpes-Côte d'Azur region in Southeastern France.

== Population ==
Historical population
Year	Pop.	±% p.a.
1968	903	—
1975	1,191	+4.03%
1982	1,426	+2.61%
1990	1,710	+2.30%
1999	1,871	+1.00%
2007	2,238	+2.26%
2012	2,487	+2.13%
2017	2,603	+0.92%
2023	2,486	−0.76%
Source: INSEE

== See also ==
- Communes of the Vaucluse department
