= La Roque-Alric =

Commune in France

- Commune
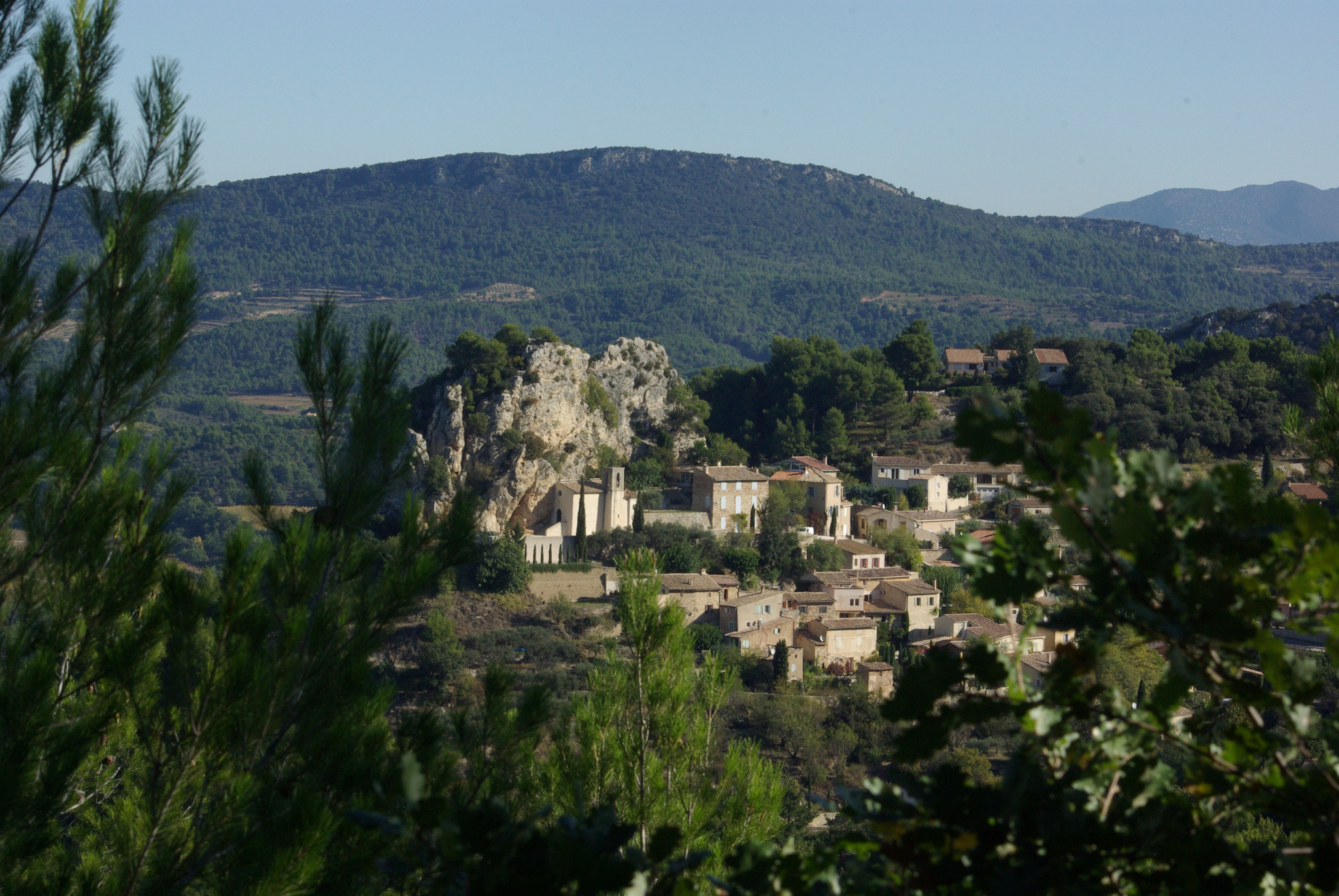
- A view of La Roque-Alric from the nearby hillside

- Coat of arms
- Location of La Roque-Alric
- Location within France Location within Provence-Alpes-Côte d'Azur
- Coordinates: 44°08′37″N 5°03′54″E
- Country: France
- Region: Provence-Alpes-Côte d'Azur
- Department: Vaucluse
- Arrondissement: Carpentras
- Canton: Vaison-la-Romaine
- Intercommunality: CA Ventoux-Comtat Venaissin

Government
  - Mayor (2020–2026): José Linhares
- Area^{1}: 4.87 km^{2} (1.88 sq mi)
- Elevation: 250 m (820 ft)
- Highest elevation: 517 m (1,696 ft)
- Lowest elevation: 150 m (490 ft)
- Population (2023): 50
  - Density: 10/km^{2} (27/sq mi)
- Time zone: UTC+01:00 (CET)
  - Summer (DST): UTC+02:00 (CEST)
- INSEE/Postal code: 84100 /84190
- ^{1} French Land Register data, which excludes lakes, ponds, glaciers > 1 km^{2} (0.386 sq mi or 247 acres) and river estuaries.

La Roque-Alric (French pronunciation: [la ʁɔk alʁik]; Occitan: La Ròca Alric) is a commune in the Vaucluse department in the Provence-Alpes-Côte d'Azur region in southeastern France.

== Geography ==
Placed on a rocky outcrop, La Roque-Alric is in the centre of the Dentelles de Montmirail.

== Sights ==
The church is at the highest point in the village, reached by narrow streets, from where there is a view of the Dentelles de Montmirail.

== See also ==
- Communes of the Vaucluse department
