= Travaillan =

- Commune
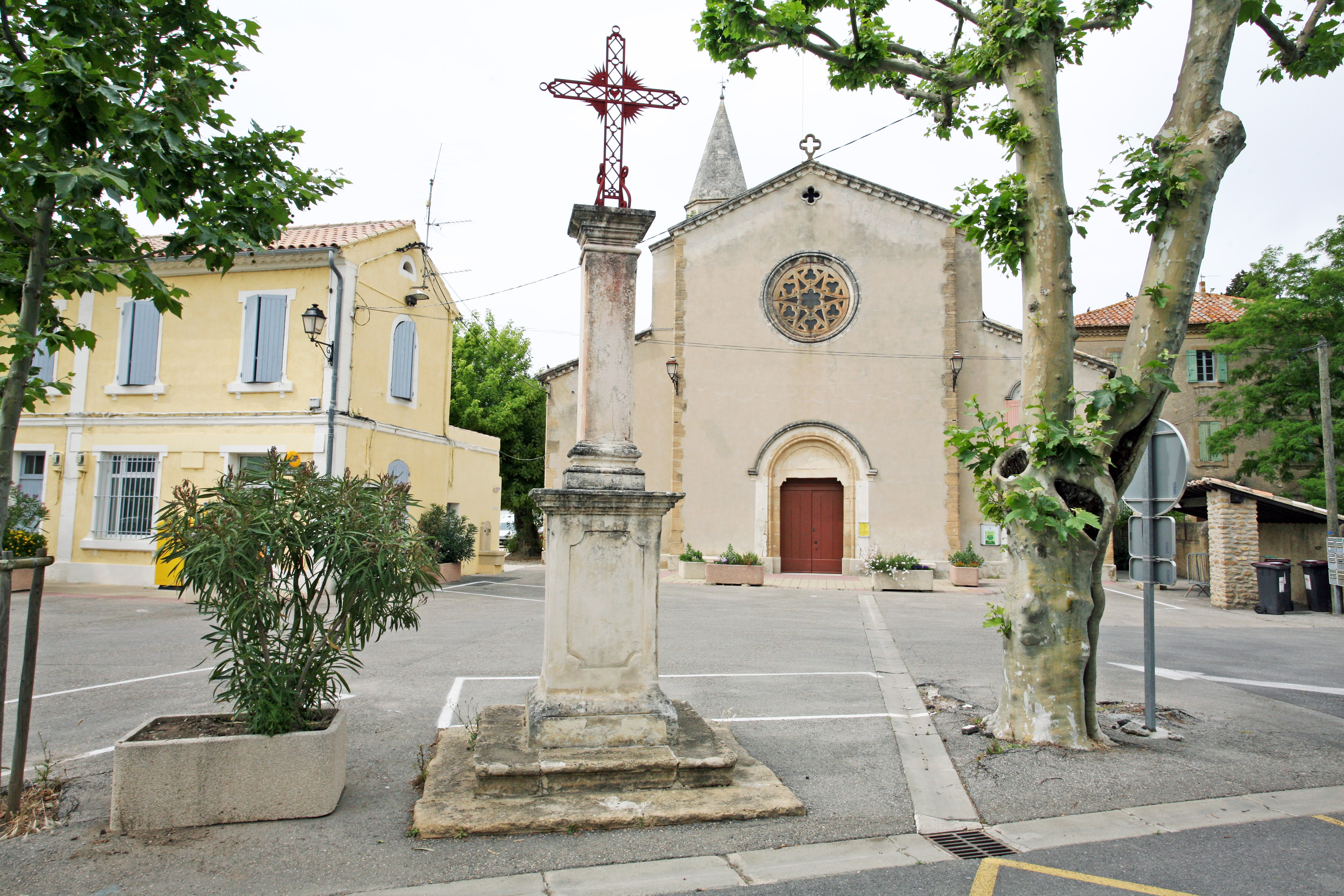
- The church of Travaillan

- Coat of arms
- Location of Travaillan
- Location within France Location within Provence-Alpes-Côte d'Azur
- Coordinates: 44°11′01″N 4°54′11″E
- Country: France
- Region: Provence-Alpes-Côte d'Azur
- Department: Vaucluse
- Arrondissement: Carpentras
- Canton: Vaison-la-Romaine
- Intercommunality: Aygues Ouvèze en Provence

Government
  - Mayor (2020–2026): Isabelle Daladier-Martin
- Area^{1}: 17.65 km^{2} (6.81 sq mi)
- Elevation: 85 m (279 ft)
- Highest elevation: 112 m (367 ft)
- Lowest elevation: 75 m (246 ft)
- Population (2023): 708
  - Density: 40.1/km^{2} (104/sq mi)
- Time zone: UTC+01:00 (CET)
  - Summer (DST): UTC+02:00 (CEST)
- INSEE/Postal code: 84134 /84850
- ^{1} French Land Register data, which excludes lakes, ponds, glaciers > 1 km^{2} (0.386 sq mi or 247 acres) and river estuaries.

Travaillan (French pronunciation: [tʁavajɑ̃]; Occitan: Travalhan) is a commune in the Vaucluse department in the Provence-Alpes-Côte d'Azur region in southeastern France.

== See also ==
- Communes of the Vaucluse department
