= Violès =

- Commune
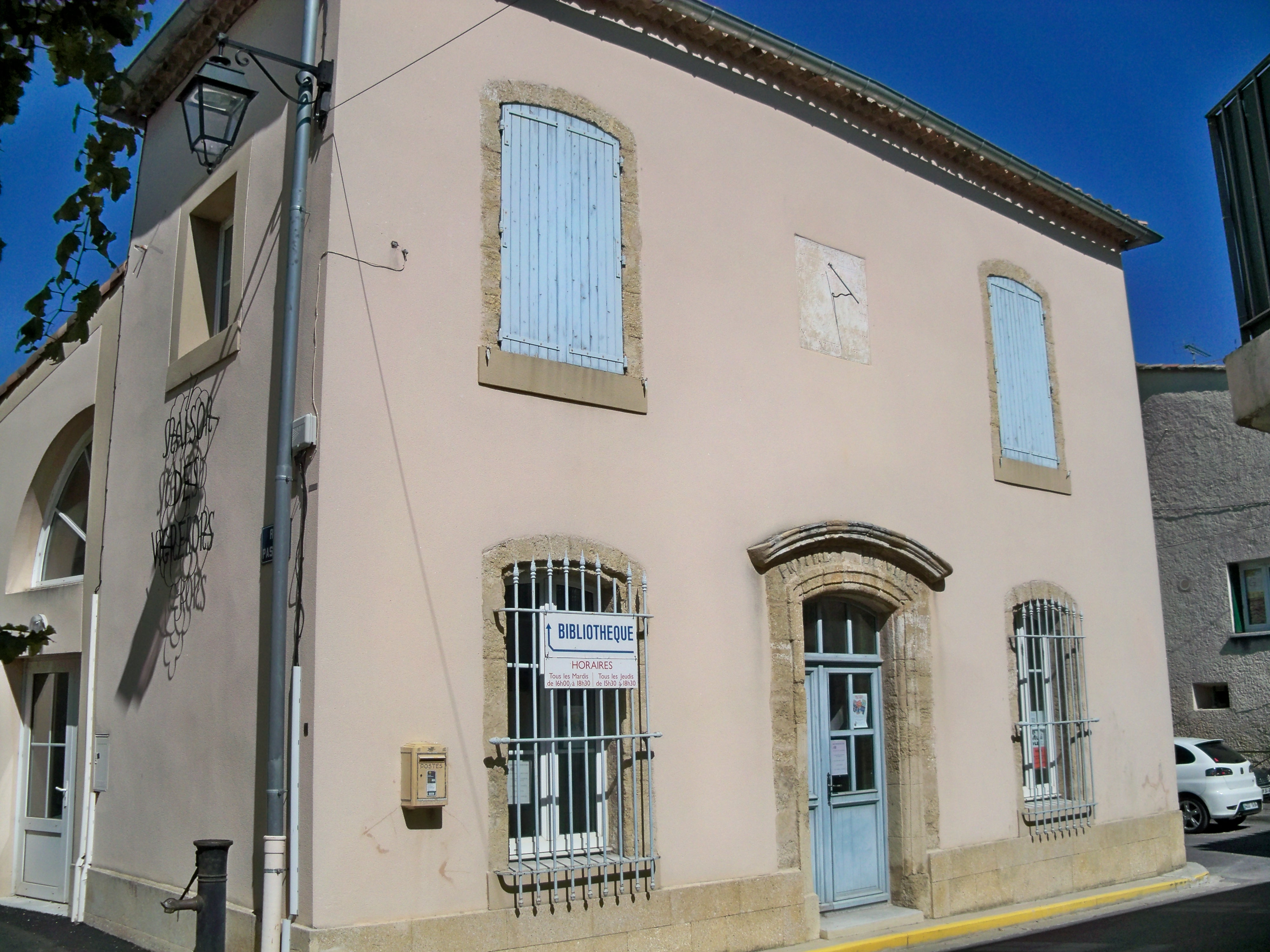
- The winemakers house of Violès

- Coat of arms
- Location of Violès
- Location within France Location within Provence-Alpes-Côte d'Azur
- Coordinates: 44°09′46″N 4°57′20″E
- Country: France
- Region: Provence-Alpes-Côte d'Azur
- Department: Vaucluse
- Arrondissement: Carpentras
- Canton: Vaison-la-Romaine
- Intercommunality: Aygues Ouvèze en Provence

Government
  - Mayor (2020–2026): Marie-José Aunave
- Area^{1}: 14.79 km^{2} (5.71 sq mi)
- Elevation: 98 m (322 ft)
- Highest elevation: 124 m (407 ft)
- Lowest elevation: 78 m (256 ft)
- Population (2023): 1,762
  - Density: 119.1/km^{2} (308.6/sq mi)
- Time zone: UTC+01:00 (CET)
  - Summer (DST): UTC+02:00 (CEST)
- INSEE/Postal code: 84149 /84150
- ^{1} French Land Register data, which excludes lakes, ponds, glaciers > 1 km^{2} (0.386 sq mi or 247 acres) and river estuaries.

Violès (French pronunciation: [vjɔlɛs]; Occitan: Viaulés) is a commune in the Vaucluse department in the Provence-Alpes-Côte d'Azur region in southeastern France.

== See also ==
- Communes of the Vaucluse department
