= Savoillan =

- Commune
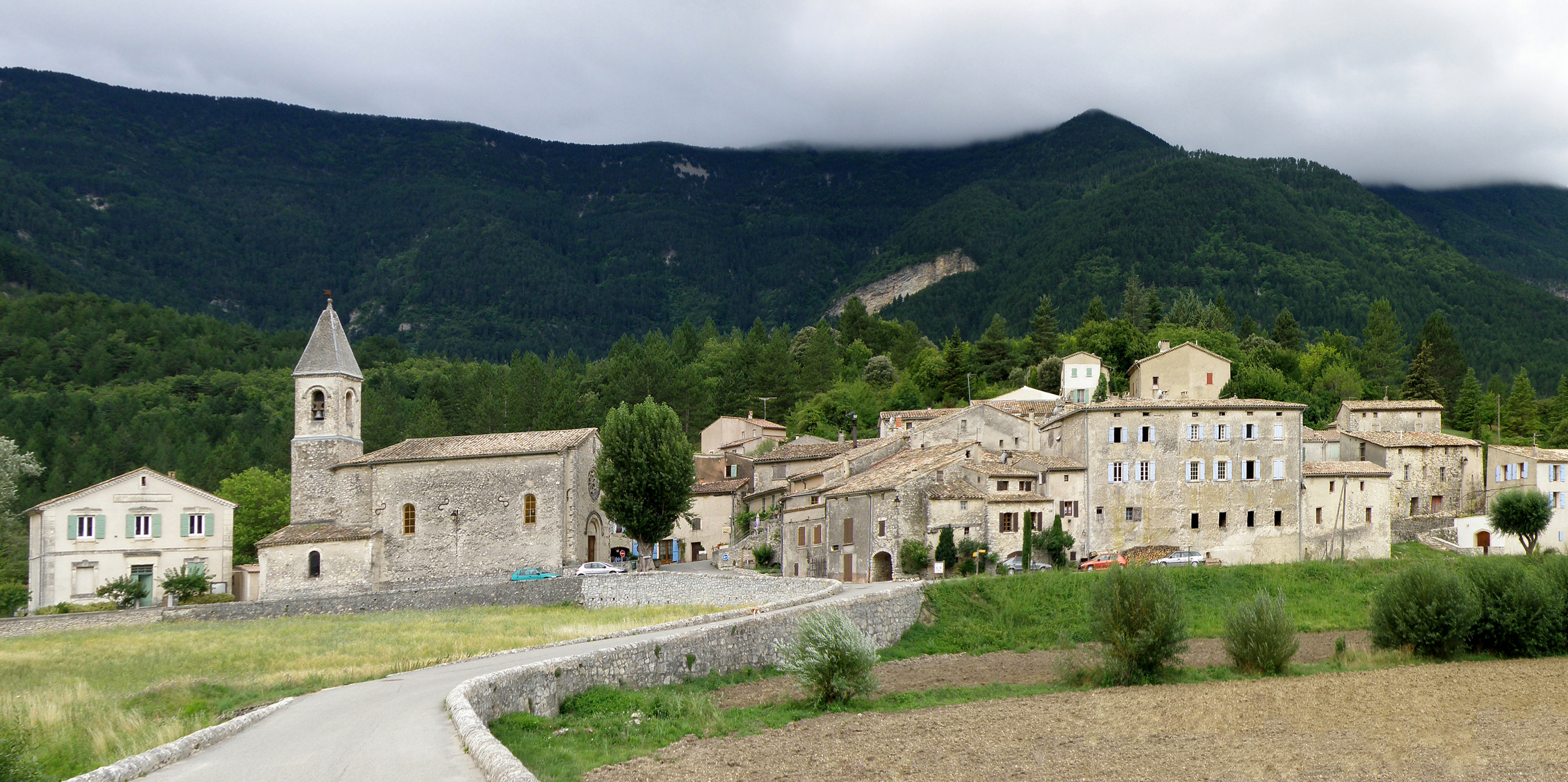
- An overall view of Savoillan

- Coat of arms
- Location of Savoillan
- Location within France Location within Provence-Alpes-Côte d'Azur
- Coordinates: 44°10′49″N 5°22′30″E
- Country: France
- Region: Provence-Alpes-Côte d'Azur
- Department: Vaucluse
- Arrondissement: Carpentras
- Canton: Vaison-la-Romaine

Government
  - Mayor (2020–2026): Thierry Thibaud
- Area^{1}: 8.81 km^{2} (3.40 sq mi)
- Elevation: 512 m (1,680 ft)
- Highest elevation: 1,387 m (4,551 ft)
- Lowest elevation: 489 m (1,604 ft)
- Population (2023): 81
  - Density: 9.2/km^{2} (24/sq mi)
- Time zone: UTC+01:00 (CET)
  - Summer (DST): UTC+02:00 (CEST)
- INSEE/Postal code: 84125 /84390
- ^{1} French Land Register data, which excludes lakes, ponds, glaciers > 1 km^{2} (0.386 sq mi or 247 acres) and river estuaries.

Savoillan is a commune in the Vaucluse department in the Provence-Alpes-Côte d'Azur region in southeastern France.

== See also ==
- Communes of the Vaucluse department
