= Jonquières, Vaucluse =

Jonquières
- Commune
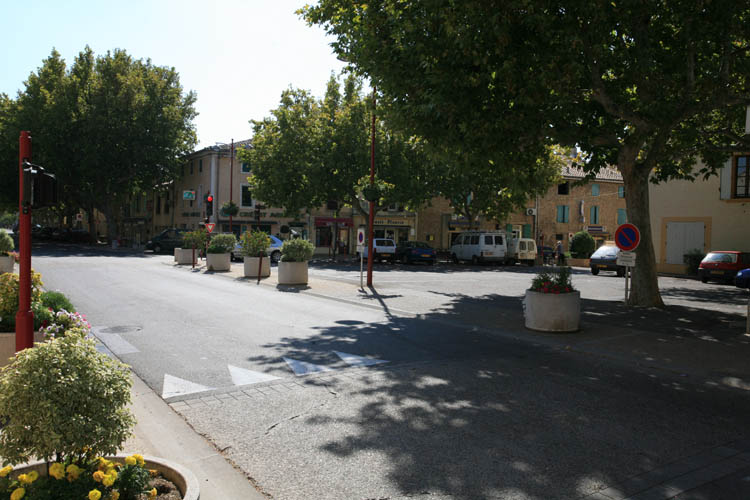
- View of the village of Jonquières

- Coat of arms
- Location of Jonquières
- Location within France Location within Provence-Alpes-Côte d'Azur
- Coordinates: 44°06′58″N 4°53′59″E
- Country: France
- Region: Provence-Alpes-Côte d'Azur
- Department: Vaucluse
- Arrondissement: Carpentras
- Canton: Sorgues
- Intercommunality: CC Pays d'Orange en Provence

Government
  - Mayor (2020–2026): Louis Biscarrat
- Area^{1}: 23.87 km^{2} (9.22 sq mi)
- Elevation: 56 m (184 ft)
- Highest elevation: 85 m (279 ft)
- Lowest elevation: 46 m (151 ft)
- Population (2023): 5,201
  - Density: 217.9/km^{2} (564.3/sq mi)
- Time zone: UTC+01:00 (CET)
  - Summer (DST): UTC+02:00 (CEST)
- INSEE/Postal code: 84056 /84150
- ^{1} French Land Register data, which excludes lakes, ponds, glaciers > 1 km^{2} (0.386 sq mi or 247 acres) and river estuaries.

Jonquières (French pronunciation: [ʒɔ̃kjɛʁ]; Occitan: Jonquieras) is a commune in the Vaucluse department in the Provence-Alpes-Côte d'Azur region in southeastern France.

== Population ==
Historical population
Year	Pop.	±% p.a.
1968	2,697	—
1975	3,064	+1.84%
1982	3,351	+1.29%
1990	3,780	+1.52%
1999	3,926	+0.42%
2007	4,294	+1.13%
2012	4,702	+1.83%
2017	5,399	+2.80%
2023	5,201	−0.62%
Source: INSEE

== See also ==
- Communes of the Vaucluse department
