= Lafare =

- Commune
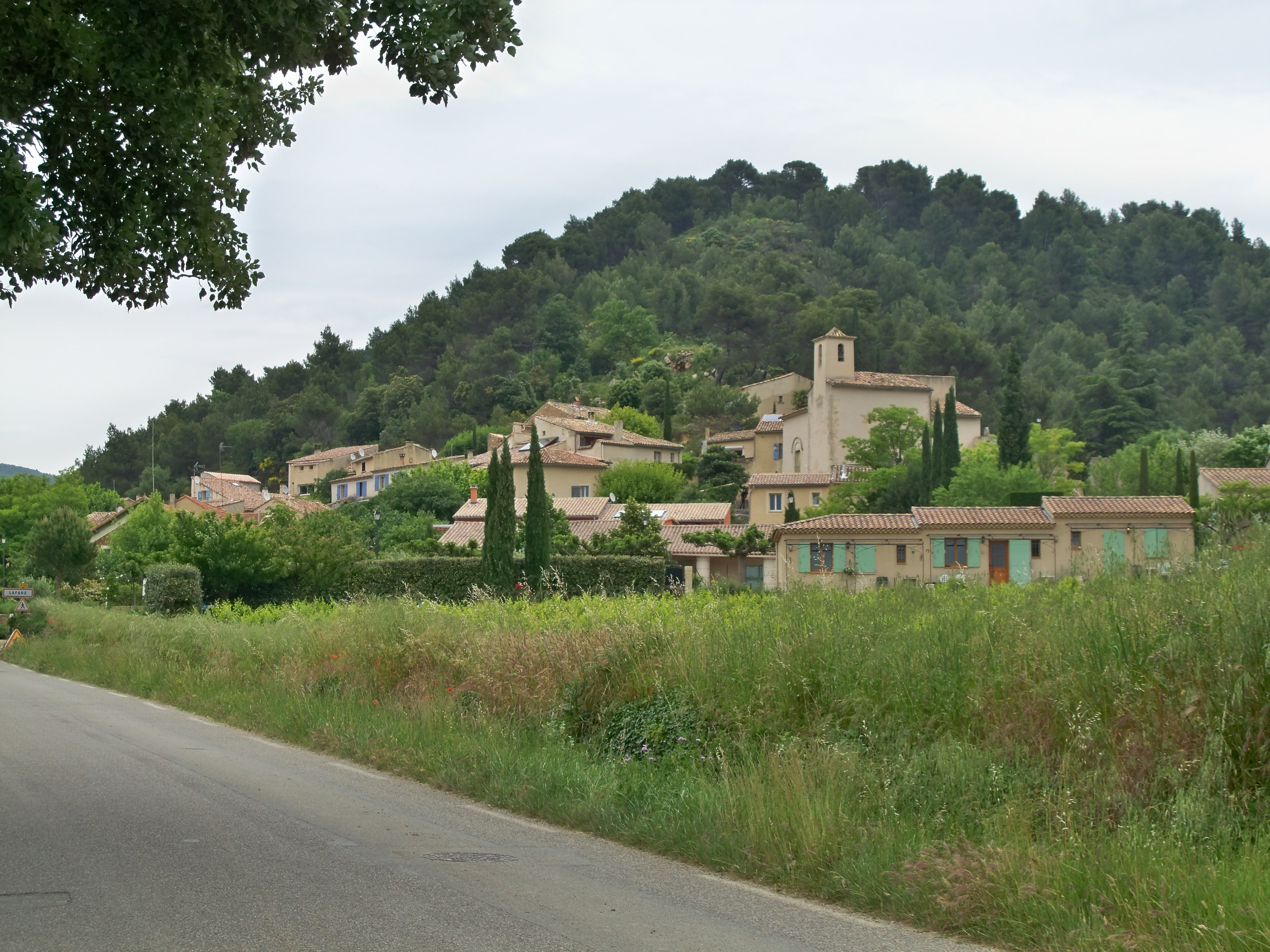
- A view of the village of Lafare

- Coat of arms
- Location of Lafare
- Location within France Location within Provence-Alpes-Côte d'Azur
- Coordinates: 44°08′52″N 5°03′08″E
- Country: France
- Region: Provence-Alpes-Côte d'Azur
- Department: Vaucluse
- Arrondissement: Carpentras
- Canton: Vaison-la-Romaine
- Intercommunality: CA Ventoux-Comtat Venaissin

Government
  - Mayor (2020–2026): Philippe Soard
- Area^{1}: 4.54 km^{2} (1.75 sq mi)
- Elevation: 150 m (490 ft)
- Highest elevation: 528 m (1,732 ft)
- Lowest elevation: 129 m (423 ft)
- Population (2023): 130
  - Density: 29/km^{2} (74/sq mi)
- Time zone: UTC+01:00 (CET)
  - Summer (DST): UTC+02:00 (CEST)
- INSEE/Postal code: 84059 /84190
- ^{1} French Land Register data, which excludes lakes, ponds, glaciers > 1 km^{2} (0.386 sq mi or 247 acres) and river estuaries.

Lafare (French pronunciation: [lafaʁ]; Occitan: La Fara) is a commune in the Vaucluse department in the Provence-Alpes-Côte d'Azur region in southeastern France.

== See also ==
- Dentelles de Montmirail
- Communes of the Vaucluse department
