= Suzette, Vaucluse =

Suzette
- Commune
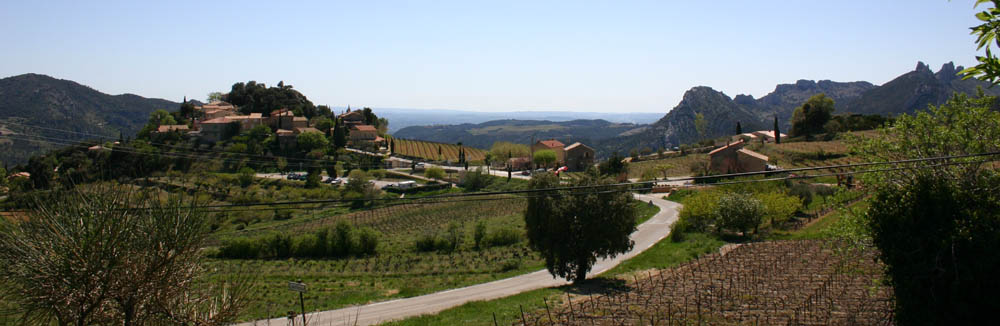
- View of Suzette with vineyards

- Coat of arms
- Location of Suzette
- Location within France Location within Provence-Alpes-Côte d'Azur
- Coordinates: 44°10′08″N 5°04′09″E
- Country: France
- Region: Provence-Alpes-Côte d'Azur
- Department: Vaucluse
- Arrondissement: Carpentras
- Canton: Vaison-la-Romaine
- Intercommunality: CA Ventoux-Comtat Venaissin

Government
  - Mayor (2020–2026): Patricia Olivero
- Area^{1}: 6.75 km^{2} (2.61 sq mi)
- Elevation: 425 m (1,394 ft)
- Highest elevation: 722 m (2,369 ft)
- Lowest elevation: 224 m (735 ft)
- Population (2023): 112
  - Density: 16.6/km^{2} (43.0/sq mi)
- Time zone: UTC+01:00 (CET)
  - Summer (DST): UTC+02:00 (CEST)
- INSEE/Postal code: 84130 /84190
- ^{1} French Land Register data, which excludes lakes, ponds, glaciers > 1 km^{2} (0.386 sq mi or 247 acres) and river estuaries.

Suzette (French pronunciation: [syzɛt]; Occitan: Suseta) is a commune in the Vaucluse department in the Provence-Alpes-Côte d'Azur region in southeastern France.

== See also ==
- Dentelles de Montmirail
- Communes of the Vaucluse department
