= Villedieu, Vaucluse =

Villedieu
- Commune
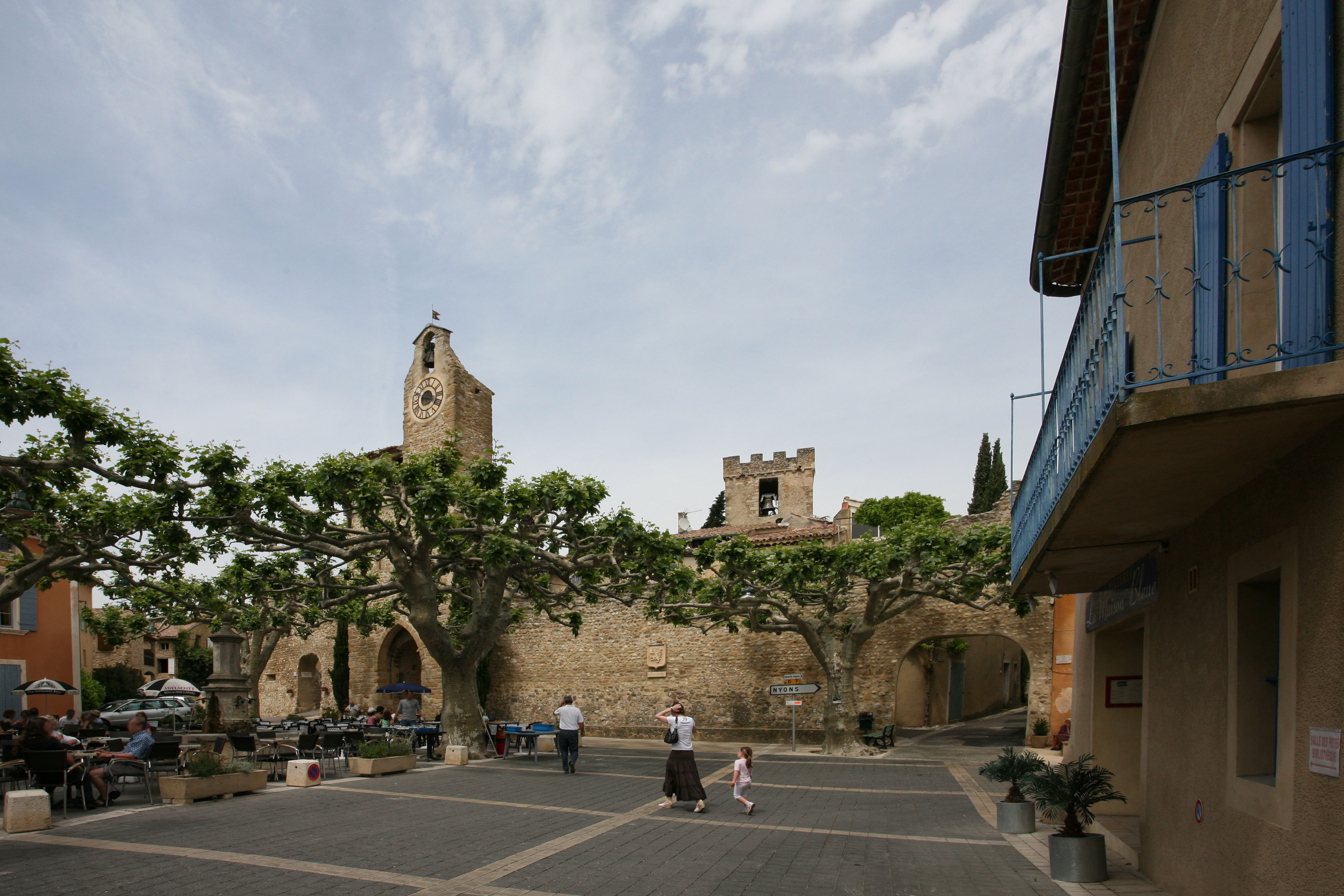
- The square in front of the town hall, in Villedieu

- Coat of arms
- Location of Villedieu
- Location within France Location within Provence-Alpes-Côte d'Azur
- Coordinates: 44°17′04″N 5°02′08″E
- Country: France
- Region: Provence-Alpes-Côte d'Azur
- Department: Vaucluse
- Arrondissement: Carpentras
- Canton: Vaison-la-Romaine

Government
  - Mayor (2020–2026): Joël Bouffies
- Area^{1}: 11.38 km^{2} (4.39 sq mi)
- Elevation: 280 m (920 ft)
- Highest elevation: 443 m (1,453 ft)
- Lowest elevation: 176 m (577 ft)
- Population (2023): 507
  - Density: 44.6/km^{2} (115/sq mi)
- Time zone: UTC+01:00 (CET)
  - Summer (DST): UTC+02:00 (CEST)
- INSEE/Postal code: 84146 /84110
- ^{1} French Land Register data, which excludes lakes, ponds, glaciers > 1 km^{2} (0.386 sq mi or 247 acres) and river estuaries.

Villedieu (French pronunciation: [vildjø]; Occitan: Viladieu) is a commune in the Vaucluse department in the Provence-Alpes-Côte d'Azur region in southeastern France.

A local legend says that the penitents asked to Alice Colonieu to make a statue of the Virgin and to install on the back of a house in Villedieu. This set of Renaissance style, decorated with a king scallop is called the " Virgin of the Smile" and is still visible in Villedieu.

== See also ==
- Communes of the Vaucluse department
