= Camaret-sur-Aigues =

- Commune
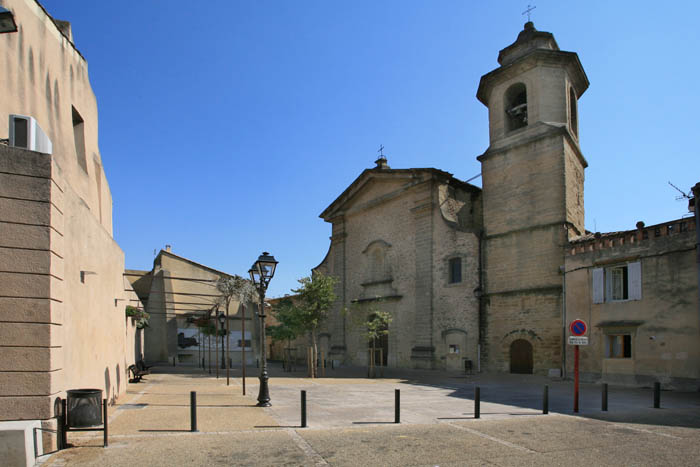
- The church square, in the village of Camaret-sur-Aigues

- Coat of arms
- Location of Camaret-sur-Aigues
- Location within France Location within Provence-Alpes-Côte d'Azur
- Coordinates: 44°09′51″N 4°52′28″E
- Country: France
- Region: Provence-Alpes-Côte d'Azur
- Department: Vaucluse
- Arrondissement: Carpentras
- Canton: Vaison-la-Romaine
- Intercommunality: Aygues Ouvèze en Provence

Government
  - Mayor (2020–2026): Philippe de Beauregard
- Area^{1}: 17.53 km^{2} (6.77 sq mi)
- Elevation: 72 m (236 ft)
- Highest elevation: 97 m (318 ft)
- Lowest elevation: 56 m (184 ft)
- Population (2023): 4,533
  - Density: 258.6/km^{2} (669.7/sq mi)
- Time zone: UTC+01:00 (CET)
  - Summer (DST): UTC+02:00 (CEST)
- INSEE/Postal code: 84029 /84850
- ^{1} French Land Register data, which excludes lakes, ponds, glaciers > 1 km^{2} (0.386 sq mi or 247 acres) and river estuaries.

Camaret-sur-Aigues (French pronunciation: [kamaʁɛ syʁ ɛɡ], literally Camaret on Aigues; Occitan: Camaret sus Agut) is a commune in the Vaucluse department in the Provence-Alpes-Côte d'Azur region in southeastern France.

== Population ==
Historical population
Year	Pop.	±% p.a.
1968	1,955	—
1975	2,255	+2.06%
1982	2,468	+1.30%
1990	3,121	+2.98%
1999	3,553	+1.45%
2007	4,302	+2.42%
2012	4,659	+1.61%
2017	4,543	−0.50%
2023	4,533	−0.04%
Source: INSEE

== Twin towns ==
Camaret-sur-Aigues is twinned with Travacò Siccomario, Italy.

== See also ==
- Communes of the Vaucluse department
