= Malaucène =

- Commune
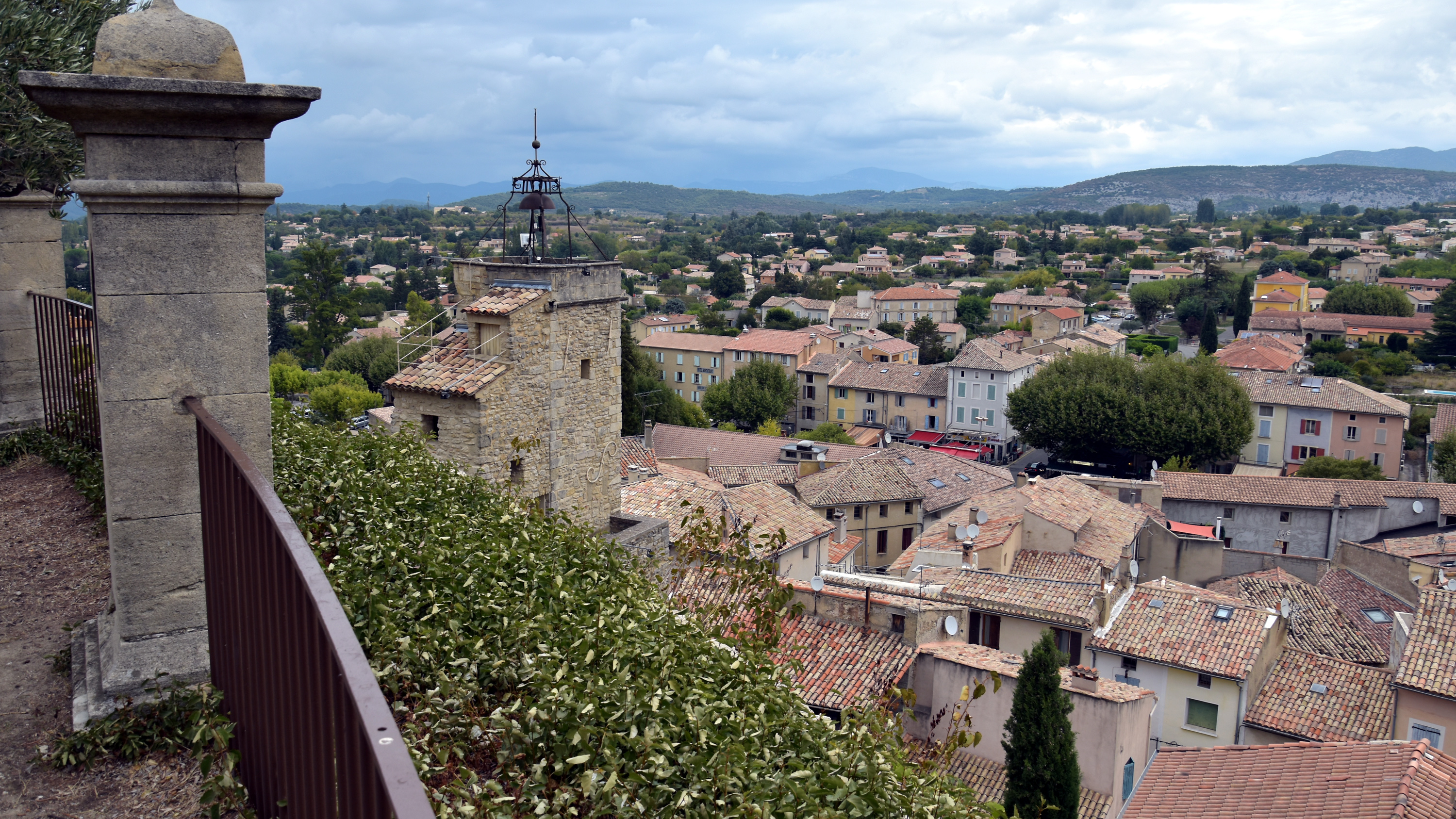
- Malaucène, view from Calvaire

- Coat of arms
- Location of Malaucène
- Location within France Location within Provence-Alpes-Côte d'Azur
- Coordinates: 44°10′30″N 5°07′59″E
- Country: France
- Region: Provence-Alpes-Côte d'Azur
- Department: Vaucluse
- Arrondissement: Carpentras
- Canton: Vaison-la-Romaine
- Intercommunality: CA Ventoux-Comtat Venaissin

Government
  - Mayor (2020–2026): Frédéric Tenon
- Area^{1}: 45.33 km^{2} (17.50 sq mi)
- Elevation: 365 m (1,198 ft)
- Highest elevation: 1,132 m (3,714 ft)
- Lowest elevation: 238 m (781 ft)
- Population (2023): 2,758
  - Density: 60.84/km^{2} (157.6/sq mi)
- Time zone: UTC+01:00 (CET)
  - Summer (DST): UTC+02:00 (CEST)
- INSEE/Postal code: 84069 /84340
- ^{1} French Land Register data, which excludes lakes, ponds, glaciers > 1 km^{2} (0.386 sq mi or 247 acres) and river estuaries.

Malaucène (French pronunciation: [malosɛn]; Occitan: Malaucena) is a commune in the Vaucluse department in the Provence-Alpes-Côte d'Azur region in southeastern France.

== Geography ==
Malaucène is a typical provençal village located in Provence (South of France) at the foot of Mont Ventoux.

== Population ==
Historical population
Year	Pop.	±% p.a.
1968	1,940	—
1975	1,955	+0.11%
1982	2,096	+1.00%
1990	2,172	+0.45%
1999	2,538	+1.75%
2007	2,691	+0.73%
2012	2,684	−0.05%
2017	2,903	+1.58%
2023	2,758	−0.85%
Source: INSEE

== Sights ==
The village itself dates from the tenth century. It features Medieval, Gallic and Roman structures (even prehistoric vestiges). The best views are on top of the Calvaire located in the middle of the older part of town.

== Economy ==
There is an outside market every Wednesday morning. Local merchants sell olives, salamis, potteries, handicrafts, clothes, etc. Malaucène has several restaurants, cafés, and wineries. Several places exhibit local artists, especially painters.

== See also ==
- Dentelles de Montmirail
- Communes of the Vaucluse department
