= Canton of Vaison-la-Romaine =

Coordinates: 44°14′56″N 5°02′47″E

Vaison-la-Romaine
- Canton
- Country: France
- Region: Provence-Alpes-Côte d'Azur
- Department: Vaucluse
- No. of communes: {{{nbcomm}}}

Government
  - Representatives (2021–2028): Alexandre Roux and Sophie Rigaut
- Area: 445.60 km^{2} (172.05 sq mi)
- Population (2023): 28,604
  - Density: 64.192/km^{2} (166.26/sq mi)
- INSEE code: 84 16

The canton of Vaison-la-Romaine is a French administrative division in the department of Vaucluse and region Provence-Alpes-Côte d'Azur.

== Composition ==
At the French canton reorganisation which came into effect in March 2015, the canton was expanded from 13 to 29 communes:

- Le Barroux
- Beaumont-du-Ventoux
- Brantes
- Buisson
- Cairanne
- Camaret-sur-Aigues
- Crestet
- Entrechaux
- Faucon
- Gigondas
- Lafare
- Malaucène
- Puyméras
- Rasteau
- Roaix
- La Roque-Alric
- Sablet
- Saint-Léger-du-Ventoux
- Saint-Marcellin-lès-Vaison
- Saint-Romain-en-Viennois
- Saint-Roman-de-Malegarde
- Savoillan
- Séguret
- Suzette
- Travaillan
- Vacqueyras
- Vaison-la-Romaine
- Villedieu
- Violès
