= Cairanne =

- Commune
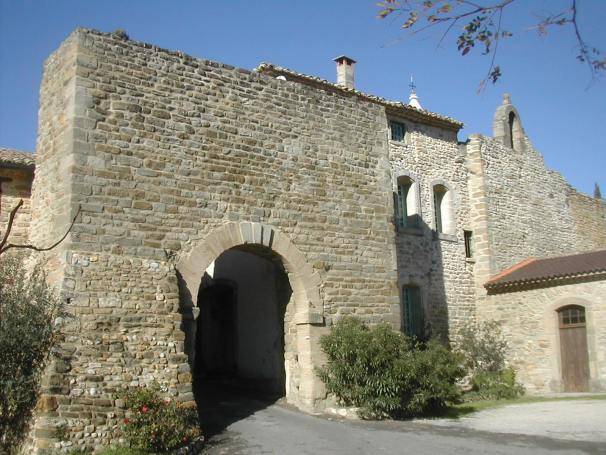
- Autanne Gate

- Coat of arms
- Location of Cairanne
- Location within France Location within Provence-Alpes-Côte d'Azur
- Coordinates: 44°14′02″N 4°56′03″E
- Country: France
- Region: Provence-Alpes-Côte d'Azur
- Department: Vaucluse
- Arrondissement: Carpentras
- Canton: Vaison-la-Romaine

Government
  - Mayor (2020–2026): Roger Rossin
- Area^{1}: 22.51 km^{2} (8.69 sq mi)
- Elevation: 184 m (604 ft)
- Highest elevation: 339 m (1,112 ft)
- Lowest elevation: 98 m (322 ft)
- Population (2023): 1,129
  - Density: 50.16/km^{2} (129.9/sq mi)
- Time zone: UTC+01:00 (CET)
  - Summer (DST): UTC+02:00 (CEST)
- INSEE/Postal code: 84028 /84290
- ^{1} French Land Register data, which excludes lakes, ponds, glaciers > 1 km^{2} (0.386 sq mi or 247 acres) and river estuaries.

Cairanne (French pronunciation: [kɛʁan]; Provençal: Cairana) is a commune in the Vaucluse department in the Provence-Alpes-Côte d'Azur region in southeastern France whose inhabitants were locally nicknamed leis afrontaires de Cairana, the cheeky ones from Cairanne.

It dates from the mid-8th century and is located midway between Orange and Vaison-la-Romaine. The village economy depends largely on its production of wine that falls into the various categories of wines from the Rhône valley.

== History ==
The settlement was first mentioned in 739 CE as Queroana and later became known as Cayrane and then Cairanne. Early on the Church played a pivotal role in the political and cultural formation of the region. Christianity arrived in Provence very early and the region was already extensively Christianized by the third century CE with numerous monasteries and churches being constructed. The small fortified settlement of Cairanne became first a fortified village of the Templars, who in 1123 began with the construction of the ramparts. As was usual during these times the ramparts served both as a fortified wall and as housing for the local population.

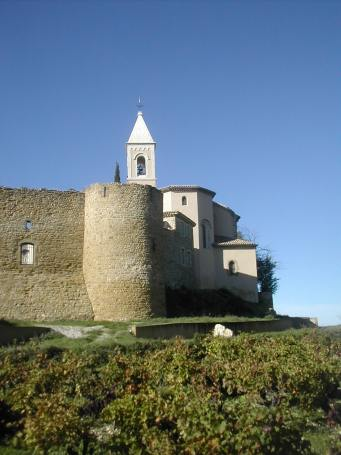
Cairanne Vieux Village ramparts

In 1312, the order was officially disbanded by Pope Clement V, and some of its properties were assigned to the Knights Hospitallers, with much of it remaining in the hands of King Philip the Fair of France and King Edward II of England. Cairanne was henceforth ruled by the Knights Hospitallers, who later became known as the Knights of Malta.

There were many years of war, marauding bands and diseases, including the Black Death in 1348. Economic conditions for the common people were difficult and slow and a steady decline set in. Cairanne was added to the papal territory in 1317 under the reign of Pope John XXII. It was ruled by a succession of noble families, the last one being Jean-Jacques Vidaud, who was guillotined on 25 June 1794 during the French Revolution.

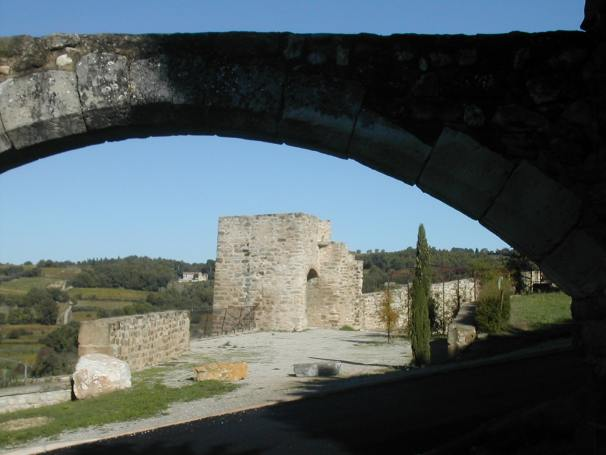
Cairanne Vieux Village – Templar's Tower

From the nineteenth century, wine growers started to move closer to the vineyards which multiplied in the hills and plains around Cairanne. The lower village of Cairanne gradually became the focal point of commerce, education and local government and the old village partly fell into disrepair. In the 1960s, as with many other fortified villages in Provence, the French government began an effort to preserve and renovated these historic places. In 1960 the old Saint Martin church, which was totally in ruins, was rebuilt and dedicated as Notre Dame de la Vigne et du Rosaire (Our Lady of the Vine and the Rosary). Many of the stones of Saint Martin had been pillaged during the previous centuries and were used to construct houses in the area. At the same time the village and the apartments and houses which had been built into the fortified walls constructed by the Knights Templars were sold to private owners, mostly from the region. The revival of the old village had begun and by 1980 most of the work had been finished.

== Cairanne wine ==
During the eighteenth century the economy of the region began to revive as wine growing increased in importance. A decree of 1766 demonstrates that the local winegrowers were thinking in terms of an appellation: "Innkeepers may only sell to private individuals wine of the place, in sealed bottles. In consequence, kindly ask the Police to place the seal on said bottles, and innkeepers must justify the provenance of their wine". In 1863 phylloxera first appeared and progressively destroyed the majority of French vineyards except for some in sandy terrain. At the beginning of the twentieth century the winegrowers struggled to revive the ravaged vineyards and enhance the quality of their wine. The main remedy was the use of resistant rootstock from the Five Finger Lake region in upstate New York to guard against phylloxera as well as to focus on quality rather than quantity. Finally Baron Pierre Le Roy Boiseaumarié, a trained lawyer and winegrower at heart, successfully obtained legal recognition of the "Côtes du Rhône" appellation of origin in 1937. The village of Cairanne is on the southern Côtes du Rhône wine route and its quality wines are designated Cairanne AOC since February 2016, having previously been part of the larger Côtes-du-Rhône Villages AOC. Other notable wine villages nearby are Gigondas, Rasteau, Seguret, Sablet, Beaumes de Venise, Vacqueyras. The Cairanne red wines are full-bodied, fruity and spicy (black pepper), with a smooth finish.

== Buildings ==
The village is made up of two distinct parts: the old village (population 80) on top of the hill and the village proper below (population 850). Most of the buildings in the old village date from the eighteenth century except the old ramparts which date back to the 12th century when first the Knights Templar and then the Knights Hospitaller lived in the village. A steep stairway leads up to the keep and then on to the St Roch chapel (1726) located next to the Autanne Gate. A pathway along the ramparts (1123), which surrounds the old village affords panoramic views of Mont Ventoux and Mont Saint-Andéol. On the path round the battlements are two round towers and a square one called the "Templars' Tower".

Visible historical remains that can be seen include the old village, the keep, the Chapel of St Roch (1726), the ramparts (1123), the 18th century Autanne Gate, the Chemin de Ronde de St Roch (a path round the battlements), the Templars' Tower, and the Chapel of Notre Dame des Exés (1631).

== Twin towns – sister cities ==
- Flobecq, Belgium (since 1978)
- Žďár nad Sázavou, Czech Republic (since 2003)

== See also ==
- Communes of the Vaucluse department
