= Gigondas =

Gigondas Gigondàs (Occitan)
- Commune
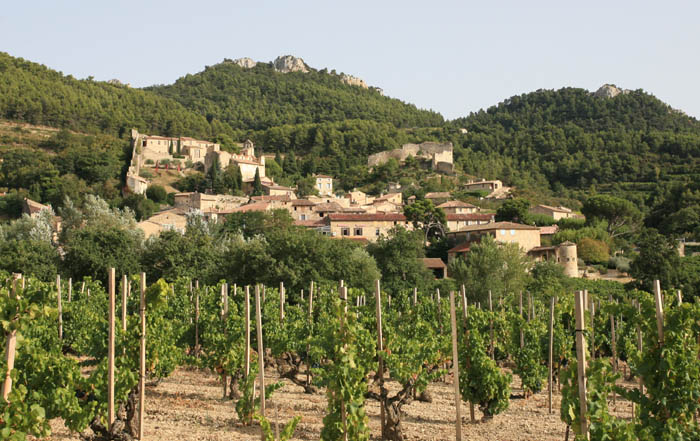
- View of Gigondas and its vineyard

- Coat of arms
- Location of Gigondas
- Location within France Location within Provence-Alpes-Côte d'Azur
- Coordinates: 44°09′53″N 5°00′19″E
- Country: France
- Region: Provence-Alpes-Côte d'Azur
- Department: Vaucluse
- Arrondissement: Carpentras
- Canton: Vaison-la-Romaine
- Intercommunality: CA Ventoux-Comtat Venaissin

Government
  - Mayor (2020–2026): Michel Meffre
- Area^{1}: 27.14 km^{2} (10.48 sq mi)
- Elevation: 400 m (1,300 ft)
- Highest elevation: 698 m (2,290 ft)
- Lowest elevation: 87 m (285 ft)
- Population (2023): 448
  - Density: 16.5/km^{2} (42.8/sq mi)
- Demonym: Gigondassiens
- Time zone: UTC+01:00 (CET)
  - Summer (DST): UTC+02:00 (CEST)
- INSEE/Postal code: 84049 /84190
- Website: gigondas-dm.com
- ^{1} French Land Register data, which excludes lakes, ponds, glaciers > 1 km^{2} (0.386 sq mi or 247 acres) and river estuaries.

Gigondas (French pronunciation: [ʒiɡɔ̃das]; Occitan: Gigondàs) is a commune in the Vaucluse department in the Provence-Alpes-Côte d'Azur region in Southeastern France. As of 2023, the population of the commune was 448.

== Geography ==
Gigondas represents the main gateway to the west of the Dentelles de Montmirail, which are located in its territory, and is therefore a sought-after stopover town for climbing and hiking enthusiasts.

=== Transportation access ===
The village is located 15 km south of Vaison-la-Romaine, 15 km east of Orange (A7 autoroute, exit 21 "ORANGE Centre"), and 12 km northeast of Carpentras.

Departmental roads 7, 8, 79, and 80 pass through the commune, but only the last two approach the village entrance.

=== Geology and paleontology ===
Eugène Raspail, in a work dedicated to his uncle François-Vincent, provided a still relevant description of the Gigondas terroir within the Dentelles de Montmirail:

"The relief of the Gigondas territory presents three main and parallel ranges, running from west to northeast, following a curve whose center would be in the northwest. The crest line of these three ranges is composed of a grey limestone belonging to the Jurassic terrain. On the southern side, the first line covers the black clays of the Oxfordian. To the north, the third line is covered by the lower Neocomian terrain, by gault, green sandstones and chloritic chalk. The two intermediate valleys (Col d'Assault, La Buissière) belong exclusively to the lower Neocomian terrain. In this second valley, in the Queyron district, clayey marls alternate with beds of blue and yellow limestone."

The communal part located outside the Dentelles is essentially composed of a detrital substrate constituting the foothills of the massif and of Quaternary alluvium (silt and rolled pebbles) carried by the Ouvèze.

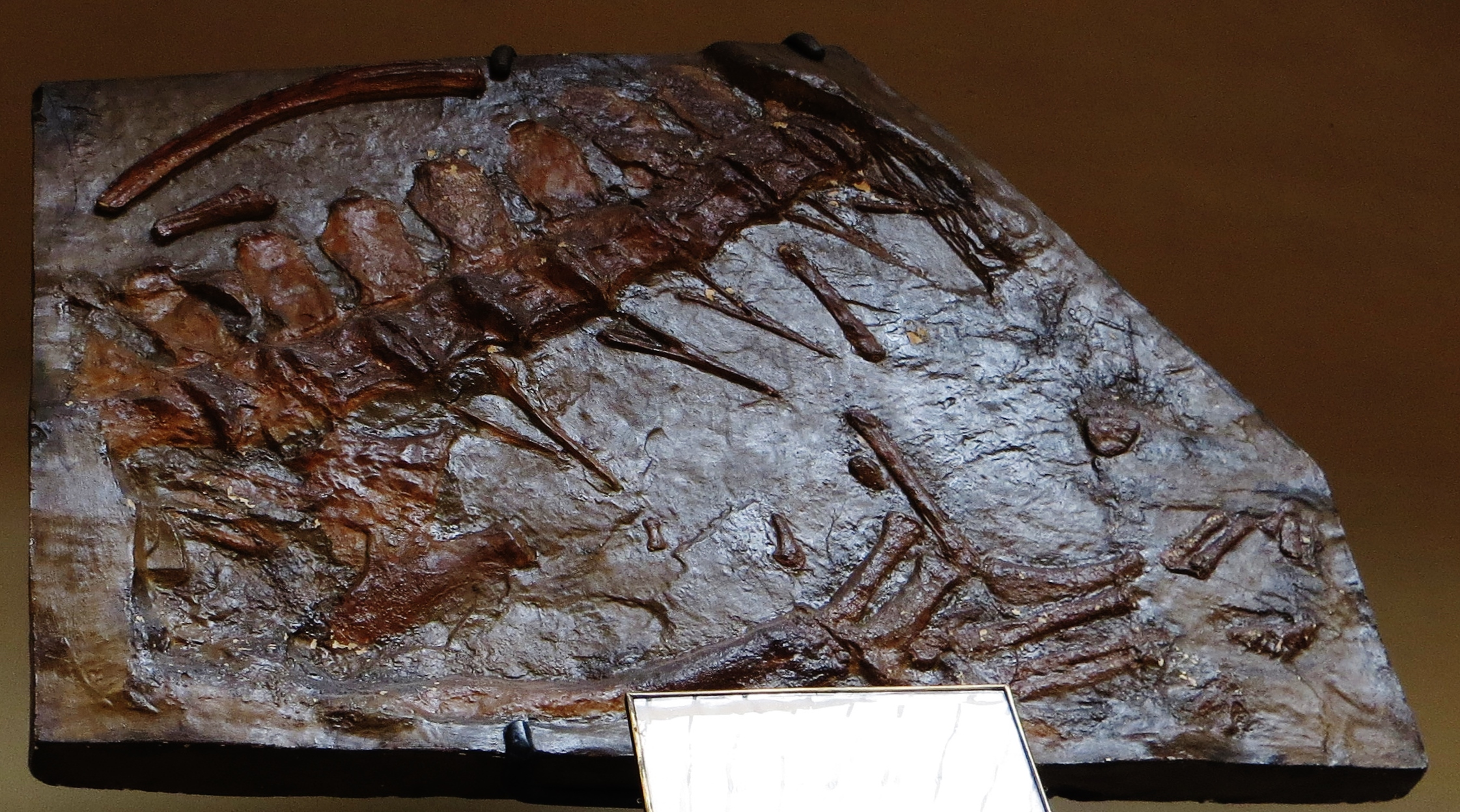
Neustosaurus gigondarum, discovered in 1842 by Eugène Raspail.

In the same work, he describes Neustosaurus gigondarum, a marine reptile that lived during the Early Cretaceous period, approximately 140 to 136 million years ago. It belongs to the order Crocodylomorpha, and its fossil remains were found in the Dentelles de Montmirail mountain range in the commune of Gigondas. This carnivorous marine lizard from the Valanginian age was discovered in 1842. The name Neustosaurus, given to it by its discoverer, Eugène Raspail, means "swimming lizard" and is derived from the Ancient Greek words neustos (swimming) and sauros (lizard). Only one species has been described, and only its posterior part (trunk and tail), which is the only part that has been found. This fossil was assigned to the Metriorhynchidae, a group of reptiles related to marine crocodiles. In 2009, Young and Andrade, in a new study on Geosaurus and the validity of species grouped in this genus, concluded that Neustosaurus would be the older synonym of Cricosaurus.

=== Seismicity ===
The cantons of Bonnieux, Apt, Cadenet, Cavaillon, and Pertuis are classified as Zone Ib (low risk). All other cantons in the Vaucluse department are classified as Zone Ia (very low risk). This zoning corresponds to seismic activity that only exceptionally results in the destruction of buildings.

=== Hydrography ===
The town is watered by the Trignon river.

=== Climate ===
In 2010, the town's climate was classified as a true Mediterranean climate, according to a study by the French National Centre for Scientific Research (CNRS) based on data covering the period 1971-2000. In 2020, Météo-France published a typology of metropolitan France's climates, placing the town in a transition zone between mountain and Mediterranean climates, specifically within the Provence-Languedoc-Roussillon climate region. This region is characterized by low rainfall in summer, abundant sunshine (2,600 hours/year), hot summers (21.5°C), very dry air in summer and dry conditions year-round, strong winds (40-50% of winds exceeding 5 m/s), and little fog.

For the period 1971-2000, the average annual temperature was 13.3°C, with an annual temperature range of 16.5°C. The average annual rainfall is 681 mm, with 6.3 days of precipitation in January and 2.6 days in July. For the period 1991-2020, the average annual temperature observed at the nearest Météo-France weather station, "Beaumont-Mt Serein," located in the municipality of Beaumont-du-Ventoux, 13 km away as the crow flies, is 7.0 °C, and the average annual rainfall is 1,317.0 mm. The maximum temperature recorded at this station is 33.4 °C, reached on June 28, 2019; the minimum temperature is -18 °C, reached on February 5, 2012.

The commune's climate parameters were estimated for the middle of the century (2041-2070) according to different greenhouse gas emission scenarios based on the new DRIAS-2020 reference climate projections. They can be viewed on a dedicated website published by Météo-France in November 2022.

== Commune planning ==
=== Typology ===
As of January 1, 2024, Gigondas is categorized as a rural commune with dispersed housing, according to the new seven-level municipal density grid defined by INSEE in 2022. It is located outside urban units and outside the influence of cities.

=== Land use ===
Land cover in Gigondas, as shown in the European biophysical land cover database Corine Land Cover (CLC), is characterized by the significant presence of agricultural land (61.9% in 2018), a proportion roughly equivalent to that of 1990 (61.8%). The detailed breakdown in 2018 is as follows: permanent crops (60.6%), forests (35%), shrub and/or herbaceous vegetation (2%), heterogeneous agricultural areas (1.3%), and open spaces with little or no vegetation (1.1%). Changes in land cover and infrastructure within the commune can be observed on various maps of the territory: the Cassini map (18th century), the General Staff map (1820-1866), and IGN maps and aerial photographs for the current period (1950 to the present).

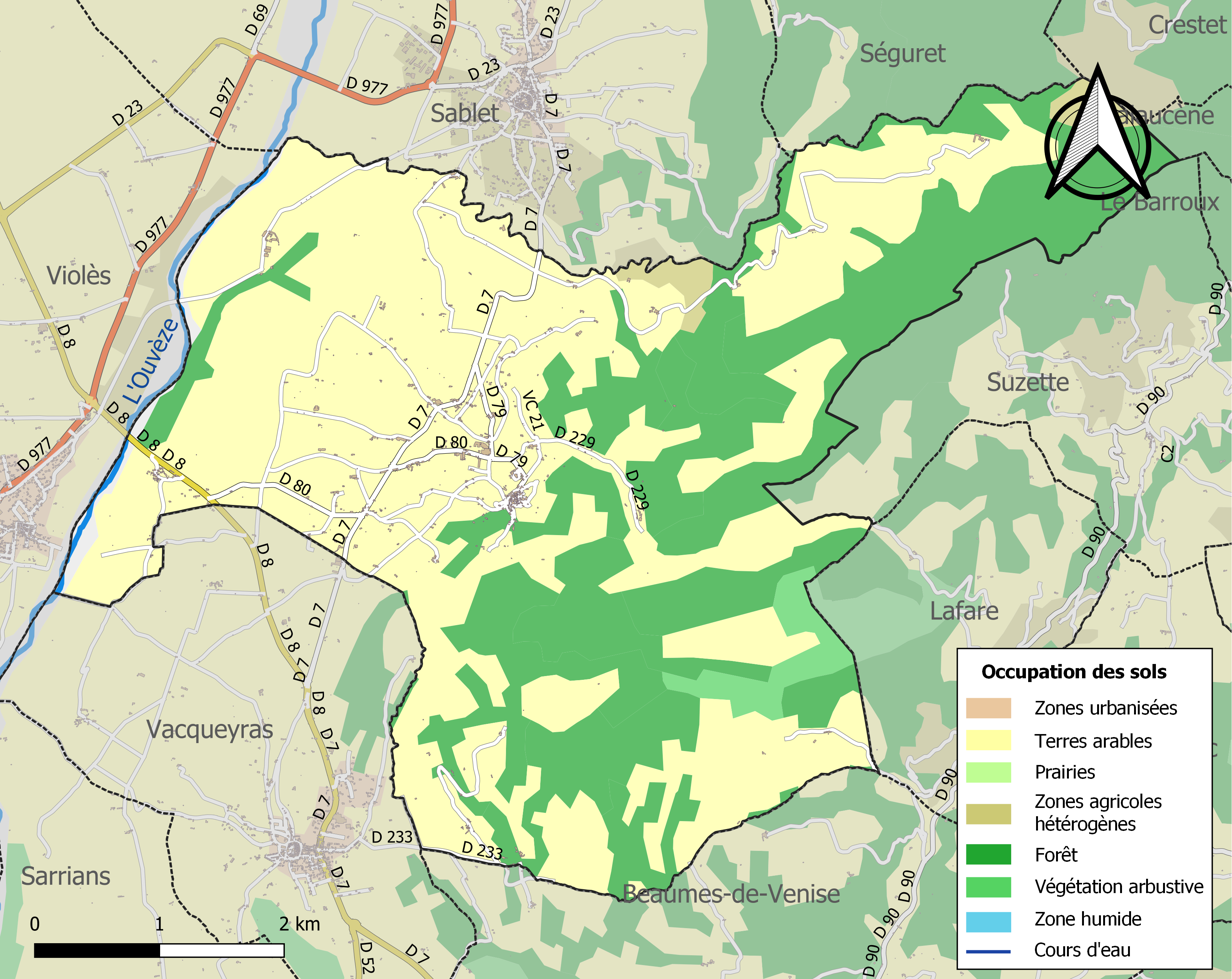
Map of infrastructure and land use in Gigondas

== History ==
=== Antiquity ===
While Roman colonization was indeed present in Gigondas, as evidenced by excavations or the accidental unearthing by plowing of lead cremation tombs, tear urns, statuettes, lamps, flat tiles, etc., archaeological remains relating to vines or wine are rare. Only a head of Bacchus was discovered, in 1866, by Eugène Raspail, the nephew of François-Vincent Raspail, on the grounds of his Château Raspail.

=== Middle Ages ===
Around 1120, Rostang III, Bishop of Vaison, gave to his cathedral church a manor which included a vineyard located in Gigondas near the Ouvèze river. He did so in these terms (Latin):

"Petro vero Alberto Gigundatis pro vinea quoe sita est juxta viam publicam est inter (... otam)) episcopalem et fluvium Ovicœ solidis ordo dedit."

This is the oldest document confirming the existence of a vineyard on this land.

We must wait until the 14th century to learn about the evolution of this vineyard, a fief of the Princes of Orange. One of them, Raymond V des Baux, in July 1341, while reserving for himself the rights of high and low justice, granted the inhabitants of Gigondas certain liberties in exchange for a twenty-year tax on the wine from this land.

In 1376, at the place called Les Bosquets, notarial records indicate the existence of vinea culta (vineyard cultivated); then, those of the notaries of Oussan, in a document dated 1380, mention vines that covered a territory extending from the chapel of Notre-Dame des Pallières down to the Ouvèze River.

=== Renaissance ===
Throughout the 15th century, the same records indicate that the vineyard then extended from "Les Garrigues" to "Le Trignon," passing through "La Beaumette" and "La Coste de Saint-Cosme."

In the following century, the Community drafted its statutes and approved them on November 14, 1591. Article 45, entitled "Of those who sell wine wholesale, that they sell it to other inhabitants", precisely outlines the conditions of this trade:

“Any person wishing to sell wine wholesale to foreigners shall be required to sell to the inhabitants of the said place, by the quart or by the pitcher, at the price they sold it to said foreigners, under penalty of violating this rule, paying 12 deniers for each person and time; and whoever has wine to sell, and sells it to the inhabitants wholesale, shall be required to sell it to all inhabitants, by the quart or by the pitcher, to fill their barrels, at the price they sold it wholesale to top up said barrels, under penalty of violating this rule by paying 2 sols applicable to the inhabitants.”

The following year, this article was republished, this time explicitly mentioning white wine. It is one of the few texts that refers to this type of wine in the Gigondas region.

=== Modern era ===
On August 12, 1793, the department of Vaucluse was created, consisting of the districts of Avignon and Carpentras, but also those of Apt and Orange, which belonged to Bouches-du-Rhône, as well as the canton of Sault, which belonged to Basses-Alpes.

Even though Jean-Joseph Expilly noted that the commune was "fertile in wine," the 18th century marked a significant shift in agricultural practices. More and more inhabitants abandoned vineyards to cultivate olive and mulberry trees. This did not, however, prevent the proclamation of a ban on the grape harvest throughout the commune. A municipal decree dated 1771 stipulated that anyone violating this prohibition would be subject to a fine of five livres.

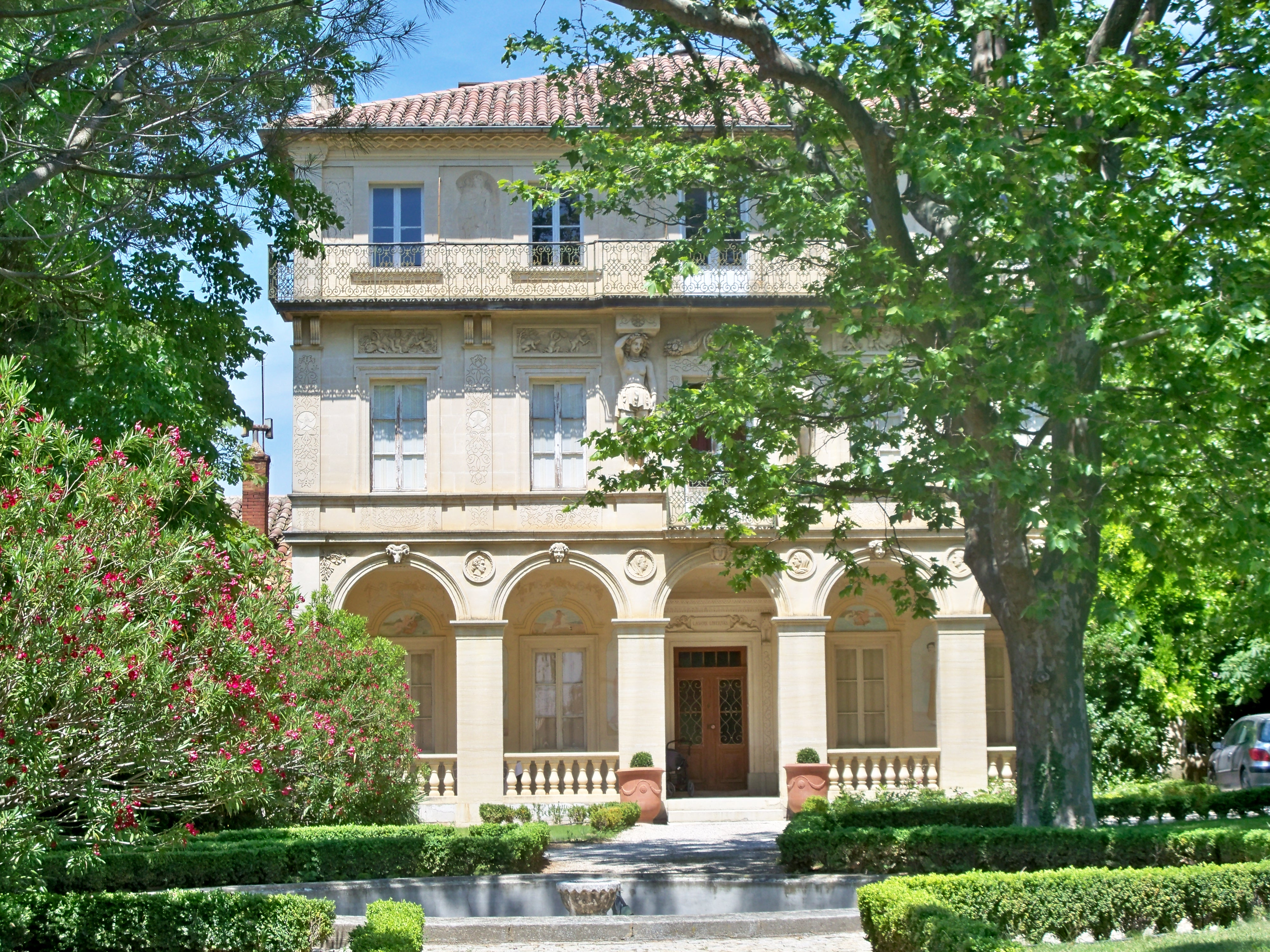
Château Raspeil in Gigondas

It was the Raspail family, and more specifically Eugène, who retired from politics to Gigondas, who revived viticulture there. In 1861, he acquired the Bosquets estate, improved the existing 37 hectares, planted nine more the following year, and then another 26 hectares in subsequent years. Through his father's inheritance, he received the Colombier estate, which he transformed into Château Raspail while also developing its vineyards.

By 1864, the production from his estates was so substantial that he was able to ship it, via the port of Roquemaure on the Rhône, to merchants in Valence, Lyon, Saint-Étienne, and Paris, who had purchased it from him at 16.50 francs per hectoliter. These results were significant enough that, despite his republican leanings, and with the approval of Napoleon III, he received a commendation for his winemaking efforts. Proud of his results, the learned winemaker was able to note:

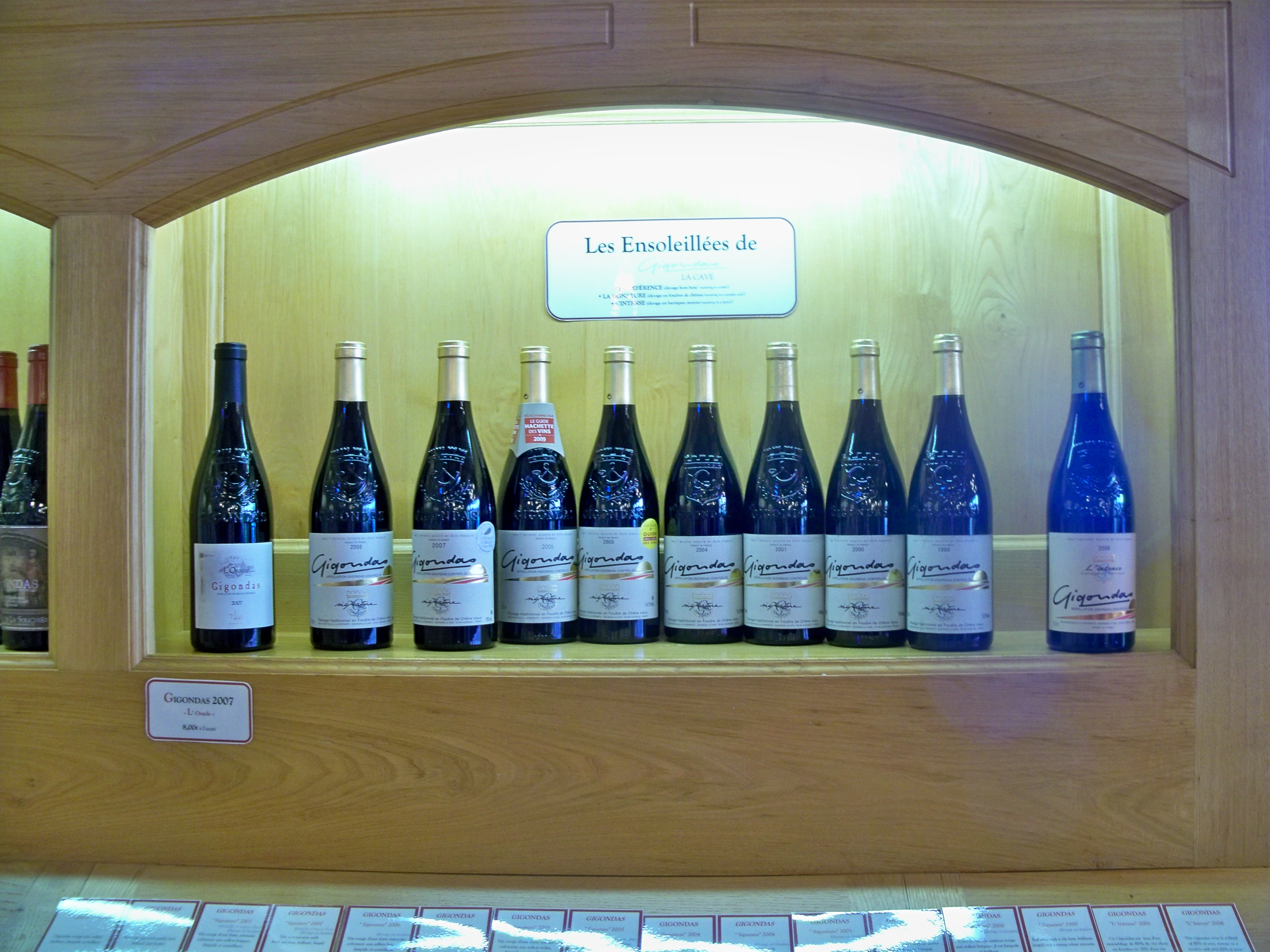
The wines of Gigondas.

"Gigondas wines owe their value, which makes them so sought after, to their alcohol content. In the spring of 1865, they were all bought up while Languedoc complained about not being able to sell them."

He was then able to devote himself to his passions: archaeology, geology, and paleontology. As the wines from his vineyards sold increasingly well, he observed:

"Nevertheless, the town of Gigondas enjoys the privilege of producing, with a small workforce, wines highly valued by the trade, and which will be even more so when their burgeoning reputation becomes more widespread."

The enthusiasm he managed to generate even led to the first bottling operations. But the arrival of phylloxera and the devastation of the vineyards in the early 1870s brought these efforts to nothing.

The Gigondas Appellation d'Origine Contrôlée (AOC) was established in the late 1960s.

=== Name ===
The oldest documented spelling is Jocundatis, dated 951. It derives from the Latin word Jucundus (pleasant, used as a nickname) to which the suffix -atis was added.

In Provençal, the town is called Gigoundas (Gigoundas in Mistralian spelling, Gigondàs in classical spelling).

=== Heraldry ===
Arms of Gigondas	Azure, a hunting horn or, tied gules.

== Economy ==
=== Agriculture ===
Agriculture, particularly wine production, is the most important sector of the local economy. Olive groves (through olive oil cooperatives) and other fruit trees complement the region's agricultural output.

Gigondas AOC is one of the six local appellations (or crus) of the Southern Rhône. In 1924, wine sales peaked at 4,784 hectoliters; this rose to 25,887 hectoliters in 1967, and currently stands at 40,000 hectoliters.

=== Tourism ===
The area is a tourist destination due to its heritage and geographical location. Tourism, and in particular wine tourism (the wine route), plays an important role in the local economy.

=== Commercial establishments ===
The bar-restaurant À l'ombre des Dentelles opened in May 2018; a public service delegation bar, it was the commune's project to revive the village spirit and improve the welcome for all visitors.

=== Others ===
Local crafts are mainly focused on building and various agricultural work, as well as arts and crafts (publishing workshop) and food (chocolate shop).

== Local life ==
=== Education ===
There is a primary school in the village. Secondary schools (both academic and vocational) are located in Vaison-la-Romaine, Carpentras, and Orange.

=== Sports ===
The Dentelles de Montmirail landscape is ideal for hiking, cycling, mountain biking, and rock climbing.

Tennis and equestrian center.

=== Health ===
The nearest doctors and pharmacy are in Sablet. Specialists, hospitals, and clinics are located in Vaison-la-Romaine, Carpentras, and Orange.

=== Ecology and recycling ===
Household waste collection and treatment, as well as environmental protection and enhancement, are managed within the framework of the Ventoux-Comtat Venaissin urban community.

The commune is included in the Natura 2000 protected area "Ouvèze and Toulourenc," under the auspices of the Ministry of Ecology, the Regional Directorate for the Environment, Planning and Housing (DREAL) of Provence-Alpes-Côte d'Azur, and the National Museum of Natural History (MNHN) (Natural Heritage Service).

== Sights ==
- Dentelles de Montmirail.
- Open-air theater.
- Chapel of Saint-Côme-et-Saint-Damien in Gigondas.
- 11th-century Romanesque Church of Saint Catherine of Alexandria.
- The Hospices (restored from 1982 onwards).
- Remains of fortifications.
- Château Raspail.
- Former Montmirail thermal baths, in operation from May 26, 1859, to 1939, accessible only by road from Vacqueyras.
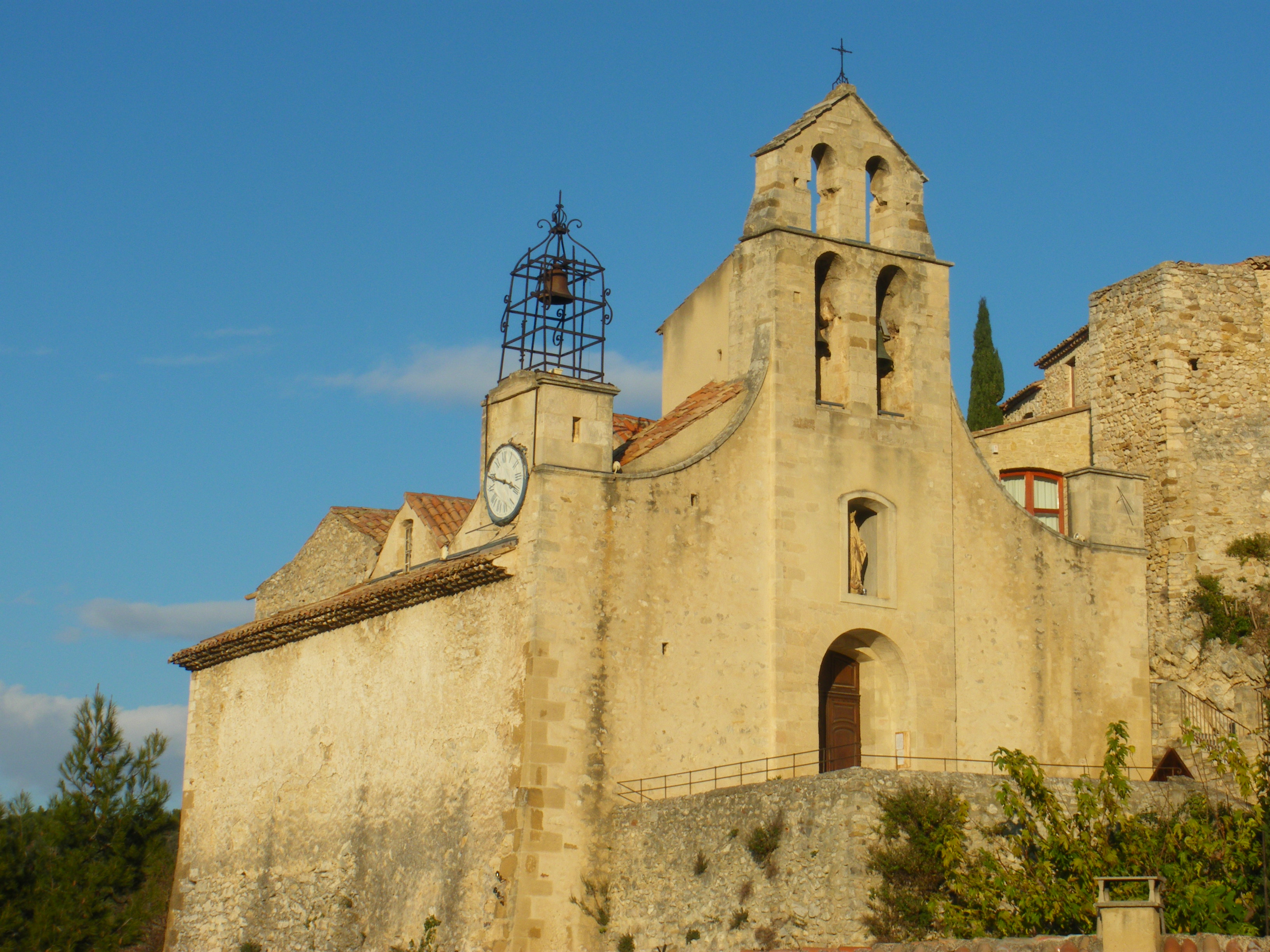
Church of Saint Catherine of Alexandria in Gigondas.

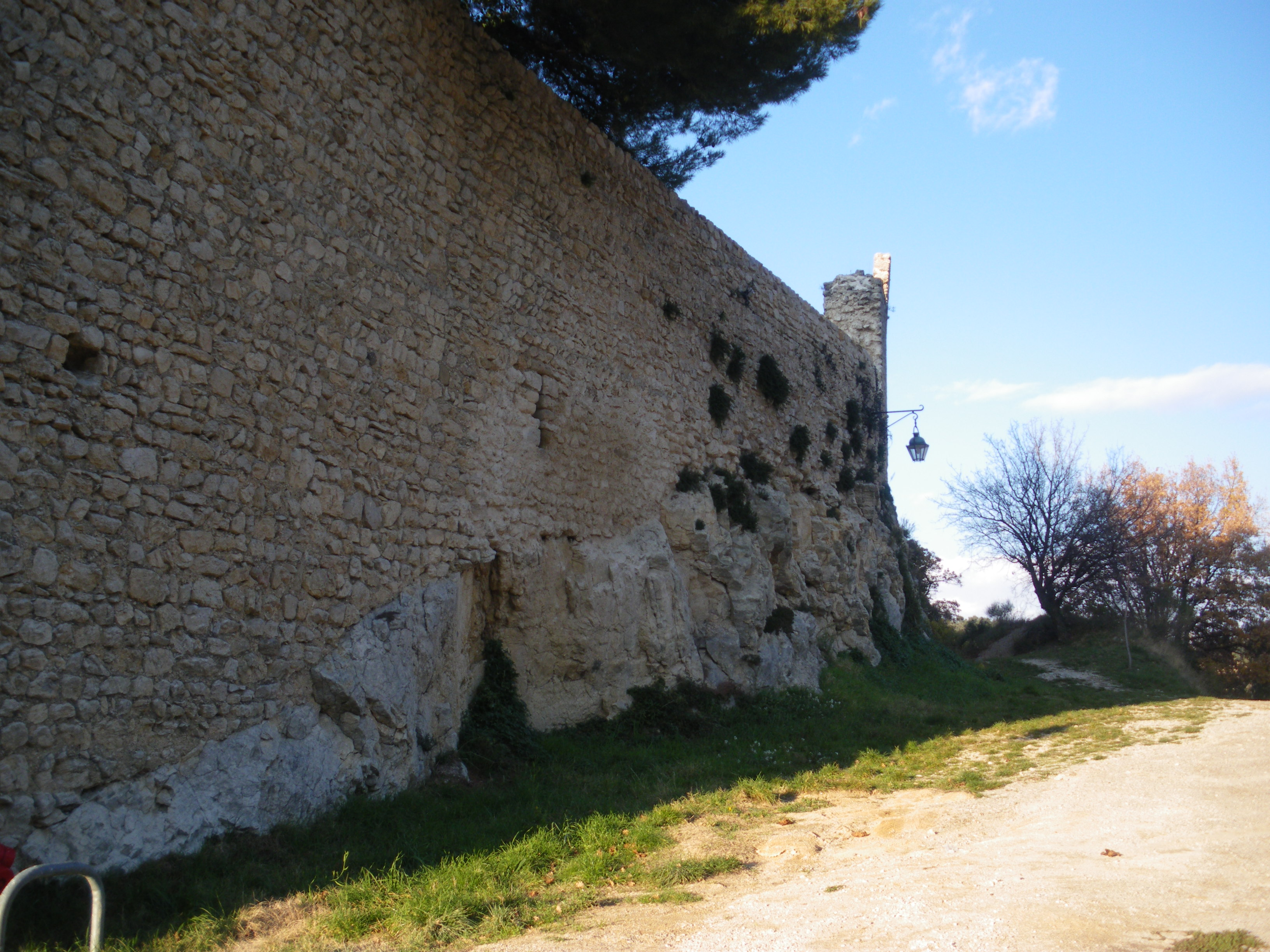
Fortifications.

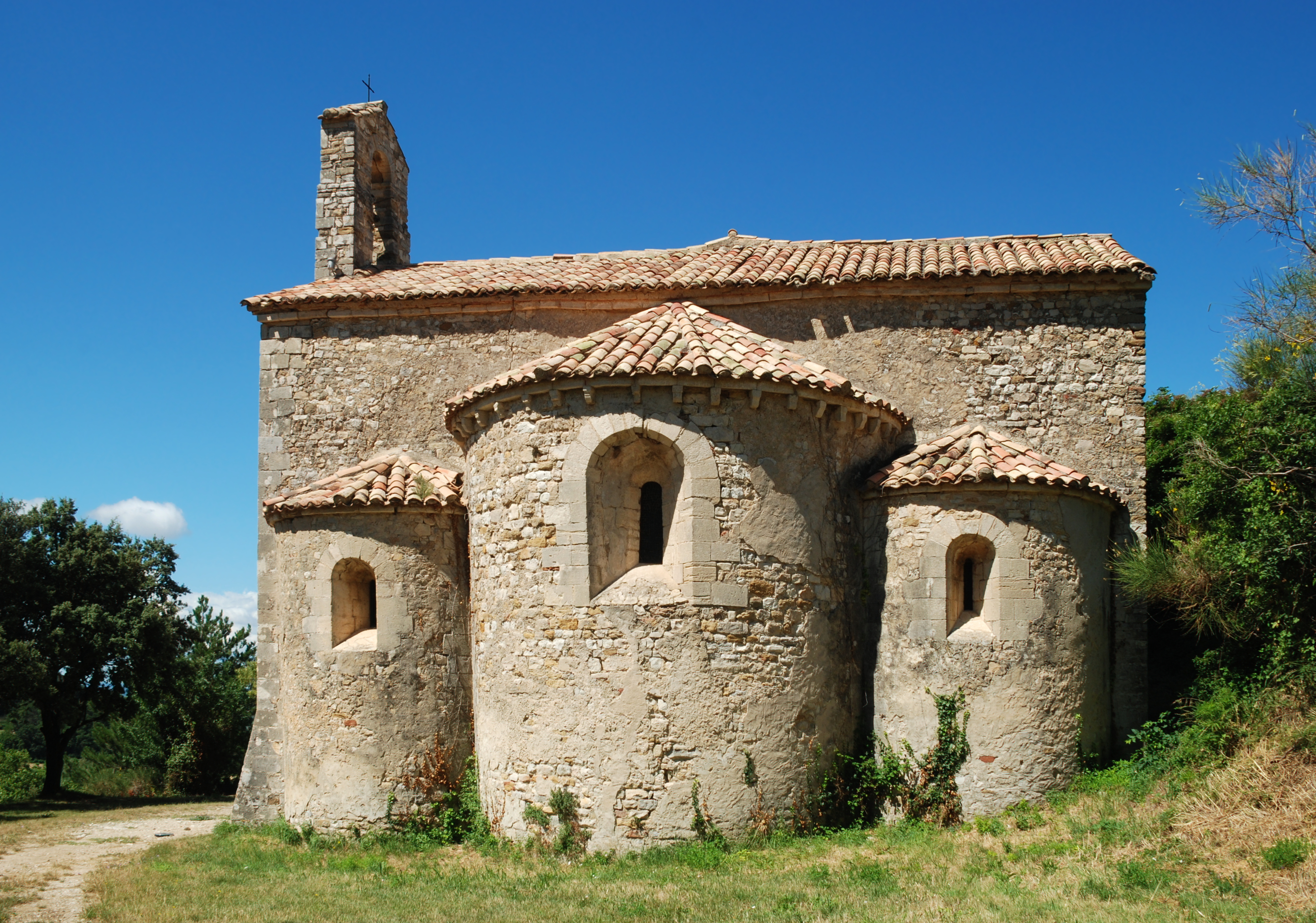
Chapel of Saint-Cosme-et-Saint-Damien of Gigondas.

== Wine ==
While the village was known for its 'eau purgative de Montmirail' in the 19th century, it is now known for wines. Gigondas AOC wine is produced in Gigondas.

== See also ==
- Communes of the Vaucluse department
