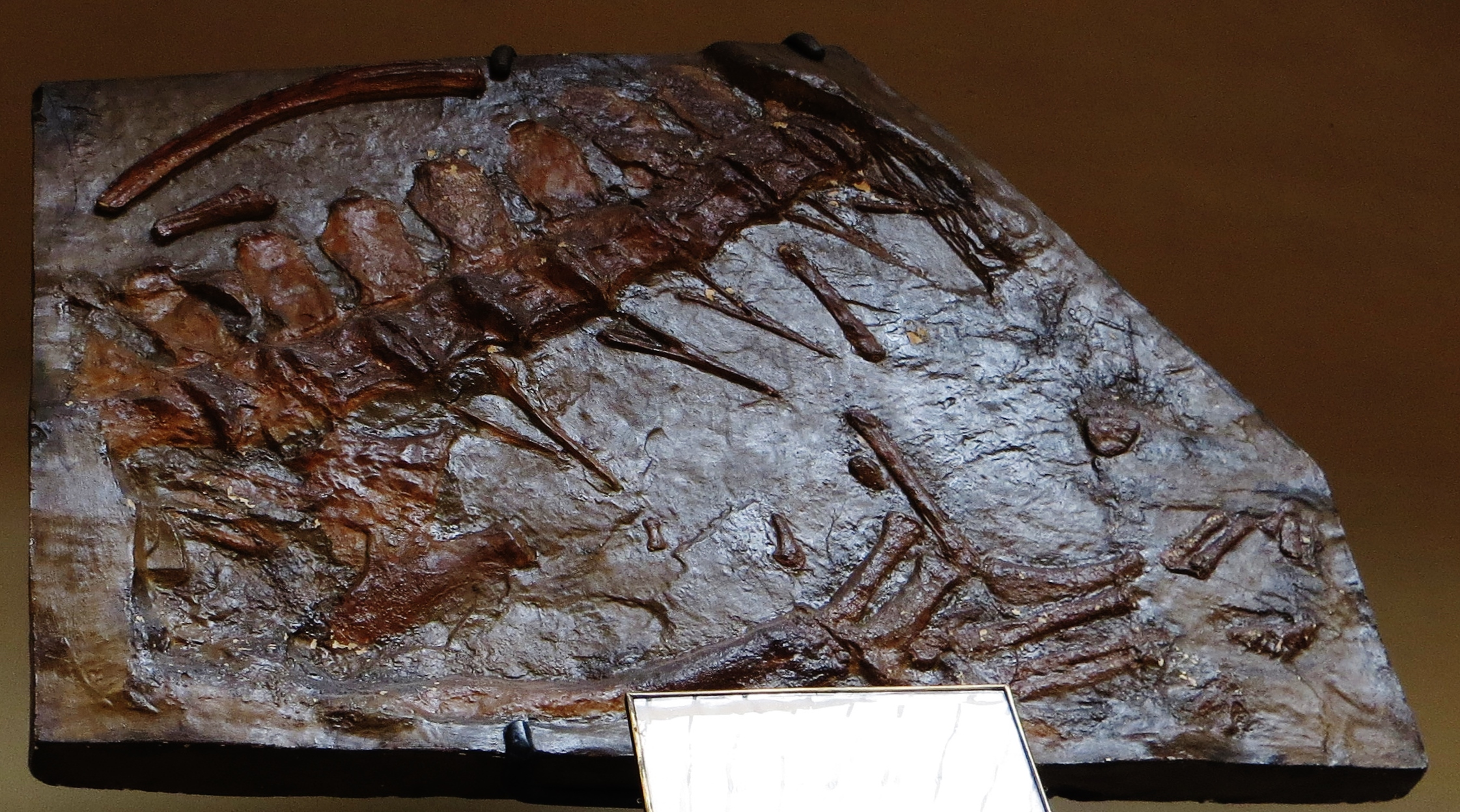
- Neustosaurus gigondarum

Scientific classification
- Kingdom: Animalia
- Phylum: Chordata
- Class: Reptilia
- Clade: Archosauria
- Clade: Pseudosuchia
- Clade: Crocodylomorpha
- Suborder: †Thalattosuchia
- Family: †Metriorhynchidae
- Genus: †Neustosaurus; Raspail, 1842
- Species: †N. gigondarum

Binomial name
- †Neustosaurus gigondarum Raspail, 1842

= Neustosaurus =

Neustosaurus Temporal range: 140–136 Ma Valanginian

Extinct genus of reptiles

Neustosaurus is a dubious genus of marine crocodyliform from the Early Cretaceous. Neustosaurus was a carnivore that spent much, if not all, its life out at sea. No Neustosaurus eggs or nest have been discovered, so little is known of the reptile's lifecycle, unlike other large marine reptiles of the Mesozoic, such as plesiosaurs or ichthyosaurs which are known to have given birth to live young out at sea. Where Neustosaurus mated, whether on land or at sea, is currently unknown. The name Neustosaurus means "Swimming lizard", and is derived from the Greek Neustos- ("swimming") and σαῦρος -sauros ("lizard").

== History of discovery ==
There is only a single described species within Neustosaurus, the type species N. gigondarum. The holotype material consists of only the posterior of trunk and the tail, discovered in France, in Gigondas. However, identifying metriorhynchid genera from post-cranials is not easy, as such until diagnostic material is discovered Neustosaurus is considered nomen dubium. Neustosaurus has been considered a junior synonym of either Dakosaurus and Geosaurus over the past 100 years. In 2009, Young and Andrade published a re-description of Geosaurus, examining its relationships and the validity of species lumped into the genus. They concluded that Neustosaurus is a nomen dubium, but if new material was discovered it would be the senior synonym of Cricosaurus.
