= Dentelles de Montmirail =

Mountain range in France

Coordinates: 44°10′46″N 5°03′38″E

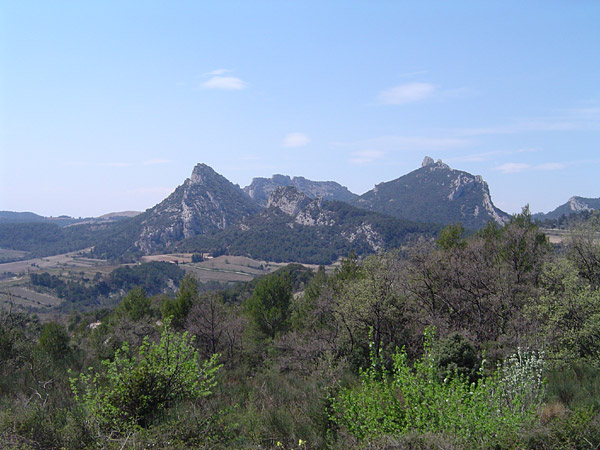
Dentelles de Montmirail, Vaucluse, France

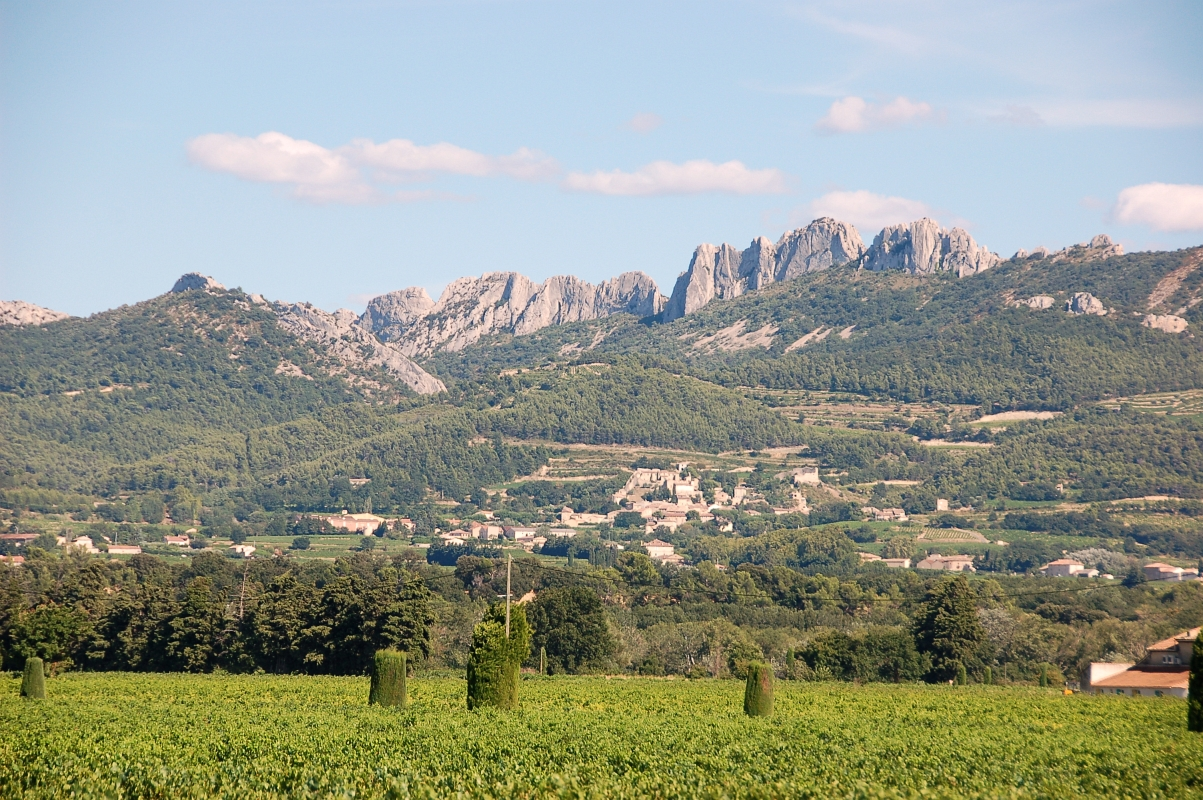
Dentelles de Montmirail, Vaucluse, France

Map of Dentelles de Montmirail

The Dentelles de Montmirail are a small chain of mountains in Provence in France, in the département of Vaucluse, located just to the south of the village of Vaison-la-Romaine.

They are foothills of the highest peak in Provence, Mont Ventoux, which is situated just to the east. The dramatically jagged shape of their peaks was formed by horizontal strata of Jurassic limestone being folded and forced into a nearly upright position and subsequently eroded into sharp-edged ridges and spikes. The highest peak of the Dentelles is St-Amand, at 734 m (2,400 ft). The range, which is about 8 km wide, offers over 600 trails for walking, rock climbing, and mountain biking. The foot of the Dentelles is surrounded by vineyards of the Rhône Valley.

== Etymology ==
Their name dentelles, the French word for lace, refers to their shape obtained by erosion, while Montmirail is derived from the Latin mons mirabilis meaning 'admirable mountain'.

== History ==
Located on the territory of the communes of Beaumes-de-Venise, Crestet, Gigondas, La Roque-Alric, Lafare, Le Barroux, Malaucène, Suzette, and Vacqueyras; the Dentelles de Montmirail were an important natural frontier during Antiquity between the tribes of the Memini in the south, and the Voconces in the north.
