= Sablet =

- Commune
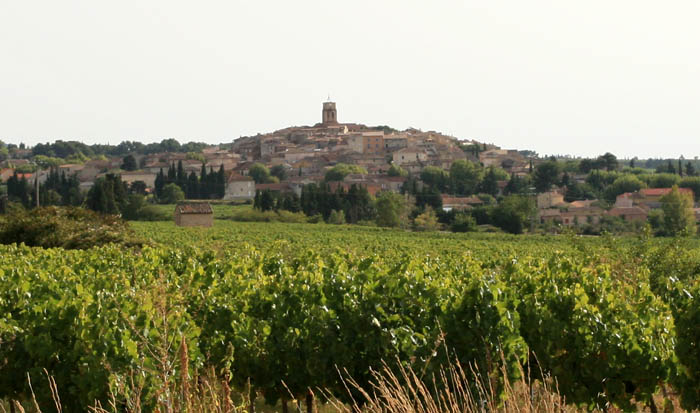
- A general view of the village of Sablet

- Coat of arms
- Location of Sablet
- Location within France Location within Provence-Alpes-Côte d'Azur
- Coordinates: 44°11′36″N 5°00′23″E
- Country: France
- Region: Provence-Alpes-Côte d'Azur
- Department: Vaucluse
- Arrondissement: Carpentras
- Canton: Vaison-la-Romaine
- Intercommunality: Vaison Ventoux

Government
  - Mayor (2020–2026): Jean-Pierre Larguier
- Area^{1}: 11.1 km^{2} (4.3 sq mi)
- Elevation: 150 m (490 ft)
- Highest elevation: 419 m (1,375 ft)
- Lowest elevation: 112 m (367 ft)
- Population (2023): 1,436
  - Density: 129/km^{2} (335/sq mi)
- Time zone: UTC+01:00 (CET)
  - Summer (DST): UTC+02:00 (CEST)
- INSEE/Postal code: 84104 /84110
- ^{1} French Land Register data, which excludes lakes, ponds, glaciers > 1 km^{2} (0.386 sq mi or 247 acres) and river estuaries.

Sablet (French pronunciation: [sablɛ]) is a commune in the Vaucluse department in the Provence-Alpes-Côte d'Azur region in southeastern France.

It is a fortified Provençal village rich in history.

== Population ==
Historical population
Year	Pop.	±% p.a.
1968	1,039	—
1975	982	−0.80%
1982	1,014	+0.46%
1990	1,168	+1.78%
1999	1,282	+1.04%
2007	1,301	+0.18%
2012	1,223	−1.23%
2017	1,284	+0.98%
2023	1,436	+1.88%
Source: INSEE

== Geography ==
Sablet is situated at the foot of the Dentelles de Montmirail in the Côtes du Rhône wine-producing region. It is located to the west of Mont Ventoux, in a transition zone between the Prealps and the Mediterranean.

Sablet is very close to the larger towns of Vaison-la-Romaine to the north, Carpentras to the south and Orange to the west, with the much larger regional center of Avignon 30 minutes away.

== Features ==
The oldest part of the village "inside the walls" (les remparts), is made up of narrow streets or ruelles, built in a circular fashion around the beehive shaped hill, which afforded inhabitants protection against numerous invaders over many centuries. Streets are named to reflect the activities of the village inhabitants over the centuries, for example climbing the "Escaliers de l'Eglise" to the twelfth century church of St. Nazaire or visiting the shoemaker on the "Rue du Cordonnier."

Today, the village has expanded beyond the "Remparts" and has an active group of "commercants" who provide for the day-to-day needs of its residents and the surrounding farms. It has two boulangeries (bakeries), one butcher, two grocery stores, a florist, a drug store, a small Medical Center with resident Doctors and Dentists, a tabac/gift store, a bank, a "press". There is a cafe, two restaurants and Pizza "to go" in the main square, while a short walk along the "Route de Vaison" takes you to Restaurant Les Abeilles. In the village square, the "Bureau du Tourisme" has information about the village, and the surrounding communities. They offer wine tasting samples from all the wineries in Sablet. The "Maison de la Retraite" or Retirement Home for Sablet's senior citizens is in the village square. Local children attend elementary school in the village and high school in Vaison-la-Romaine.

== Economy ==
Main industries in Sablet are Wine Producing and Tourism. Although the village is a support center for the tourism that takes place in the area, it retains its primary role as a living village.

== History ==
Sablet has experienced many invasions and waves of migration over the centuries. Its history really begins however, in the 9th century when to guard against the invasion of the Saracens, the villagers built its first fortifications - les remparts. The remparts were again rebuilt during the 15th century, and more recently refurbished by the Companions of the Barrys - (les Compagnons du Barrys) - an active group of Sabletains dedicated to the preservation of the history of the Village.

During the Middle Ages, Sablet was owned by the Holy See, and unlike many other villages in the area, it was never under the control of feudal lords - thus also unlike many other villages in the area, there is no castle (chateau). Its citizens have always earned their living working the rich land in this part of the Rhone Valley. At this time the church was the law making and the administrative entity in the area. In 1577 the village was taken by Calvinists and the Pope appointed a governor to oversee the village until the end of the religious war. The home of the Papal Vice Legate in the center of the village has undergone many changes of ownership, more recently being owned by the then village doctor who established it as a Hospice for during the 1950s until its more recent conversion back to a private home.

In 1721 the Plague ravaged the area but Sablet remained untouched. The grateful villagers built the Chapel of St. Roch to the Saint whom they credited with having saved the village. It was placed under the parish of St. Nazaire with its twelfth-century church, which stands at the highest point of the village - the illuminated bell tower marking the position of Sablet in the surrounding countryside. Today, the Chapel of St. Roch is also a functioning church. The 15th-century Chapel of St. Nazaire (as distinct from the Church of St Nazaire) is the home of many art exhibitions each year.

When, in 1867, the vineyards of France were devastated by phylloxera, it was a Sabletain, Francois Leydier, who invented the grafting machine which helped enormously in saving the wine industry in this region and throughout France. Acknowledging this significant contribution to the village, Rue Francois Leydier was named in his honor.

== Culture ==
Every Friday morning, a market visits the square. Stalls include fresh fish, a goat cheese stall, a cheese/ fresh pasta stall, two fresh vegetable stalls and several others. The "fete" each year is the book fair or Journees du Livre which is held in the first week of July. Authors from all over France and literary enthusiasts come to the village for this two-day event. During the first week of August the village celebrates its annual Fête Votive (as do most villages in the area) has music, dancing and events for children. Various other events such as an Antiques Markets, re-enactments of historic days, open air movies, art expositions and a Boules tournament also take place during the spring and summer months. It is an authentic village.

== See also ==
- Communes of the Vaucluse department
