= Vacqueyras =

Vacqueyras Vaqueiràs
- Commune
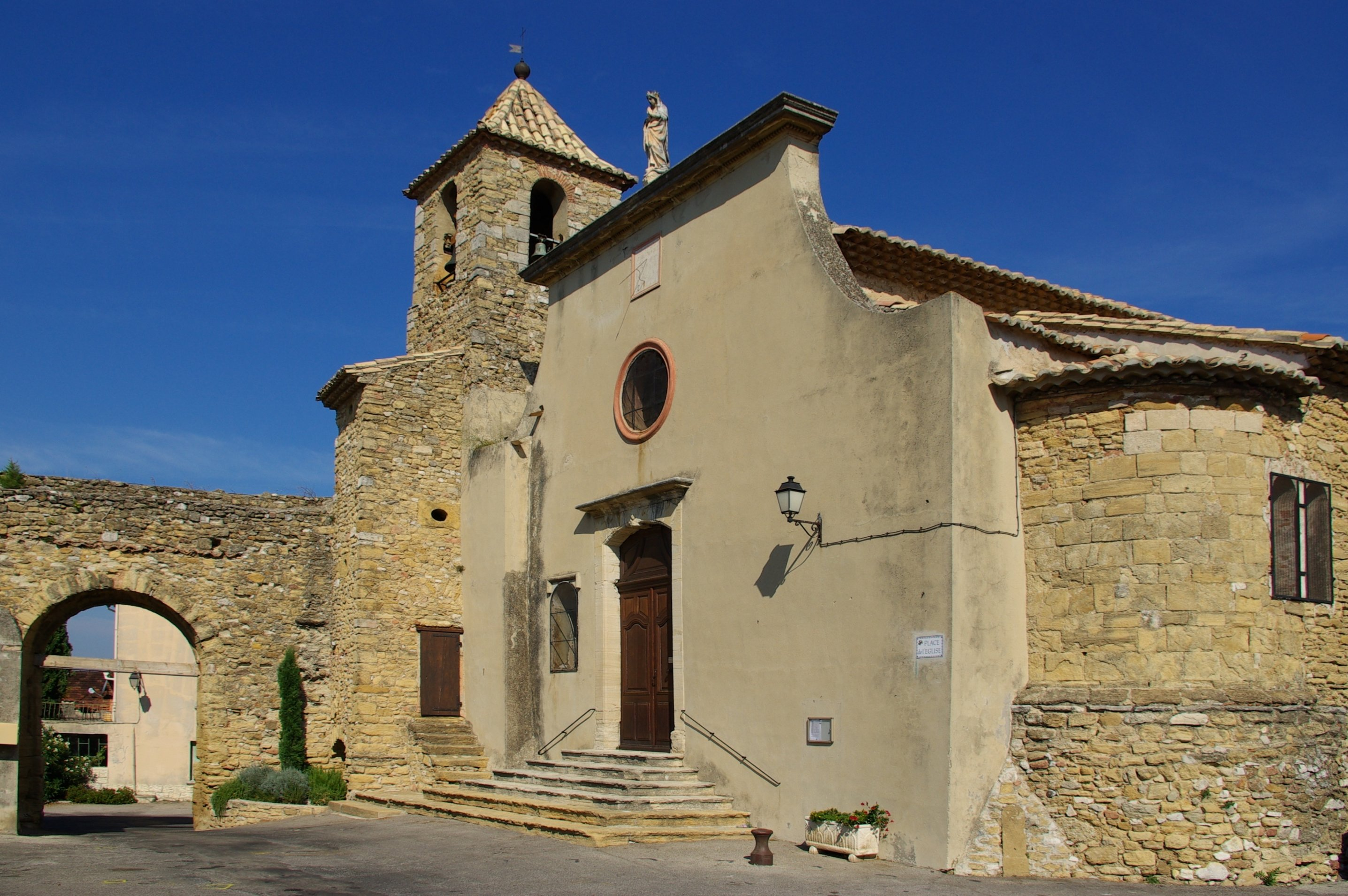
- The church of Vacqueyras

- Coat of arms
- Location of Vacqueyras
- Location within France Location within Provence-Alpes-Côte d'Azur
- Coordinates: 44°08′17″N 4°58′59″E
- Country: France
- Region: Provence-Alpes-Côte d'Azur
- Department: Vaucluse
- Arrondissement: Carpentras
- Canton: Vaison-la-Romaine
- Intercommunality: CA Ventoux-Comtat Venaissin

Government
  - Mayor (2020–2026): Philippe Bouteiller
- Area^{1}: 8.97 km^{2} (3.46 sq mi)
- Elevation: 147 m (482 ft)
- Highest elevation: 254 m (833 ft)
- Lowest elevation: 68 m (223 ft)
- Population (2023): 1,179
  - Density: 131/km^{2} (340/sq mi)
- Time zone: UTC+01:00 (CET)
  - Summer (DST): UTC+02:00 (CEST)
- INSEE/Postal code: 84136 /84190
- ^{1} French Land Register data, which excludes lakes, ponds, glaciers > 1 km^{2} (0.386 sq mi or 247 acres) and river estuaries.

Vacqueyras (French pronunciation: [vakeʁas]; Occitan: Vaqueiràs) is a commune in the Vaucluse department in the Provence-Alpes-Côte d'Azur region in southeastern France.

Vacqueyras is also the name of an Appellation for a wine from the Côtes du Rhône.

== Geography ==
=== Access ===
Departmental Route 8 arrives at the north of the commune, then Departmental Route 7 traverses the commune on a north-south axis, forking to the southeast near Beaumes-de-Venise. Departmental route 52 then continues on to the south.

Departmental Route 233 leaves at the east near Peyre's Wood.

=== Terrain ===
Containing many alternating little valleys of minimal depth and plains + hills to the east, (261 m to the Muse), the extremity is at the Dentelles de Montmirail.

=== Geology ===
The Dentelles de Montmirail are the furthest west of the Massif des Baronnies and constitute the first advance of the Alps into the Rhone Valley.

Rocky stones from the Late Jurassic (Tithonian) period with clay-limestone soil dominate the area.

=== Hydrography ===
The small stream Limade passes to the north of and flows into the Ouvèze, which passes to the west.

The Canal de Carpentras built in 1856, crosses the commune, and provides irrigation, thanks to a network of fillioles(small irrigation channels).

=== Flora ===
Mediterranean plants on the Dentelles de Montmirail compare to those from the Alpilles in many places. One can find aromatic plants (thyme, rosemary, fennel, lavender), Evergreen Oaks and Provençal White Pines (Aleppo pines), etc.

Vines grow well on the hillsides and also on the stony flat ground, at higher levels.

== Urban planning ==
=== Typology ===
As of January 1, 2024, Vacqueyras is categorized as a rural commune with dispersed housing, according to the new seven-level municipal density grid defined by INSEE in 2022. It is located outside urban units and outside the influence of cities.

=== Land use ===
Land cover in the commune, as shown in the European biophysical land cover database Corine Land Cover (CLC), is characterized by a significant amount of agricultural land (84.9% in 2018), a decrease compared to 1990 (86.3%). The detailed breakdown in 2018 is as follows: permanent crops (84.9%), forests (6.4%), urbanized areas (4.8%), areas with shrub and/or herbaceous vegetation (2.8%), and open spaces with little or no vegetation (1.1%). Changes in land cover and infrastructure within the commune can be observed on various maps of the territory: the Cassini map (18th century), the General Staff map (1820-1866), and IGN maps and aerial photographs for the current period (1950 to the present).

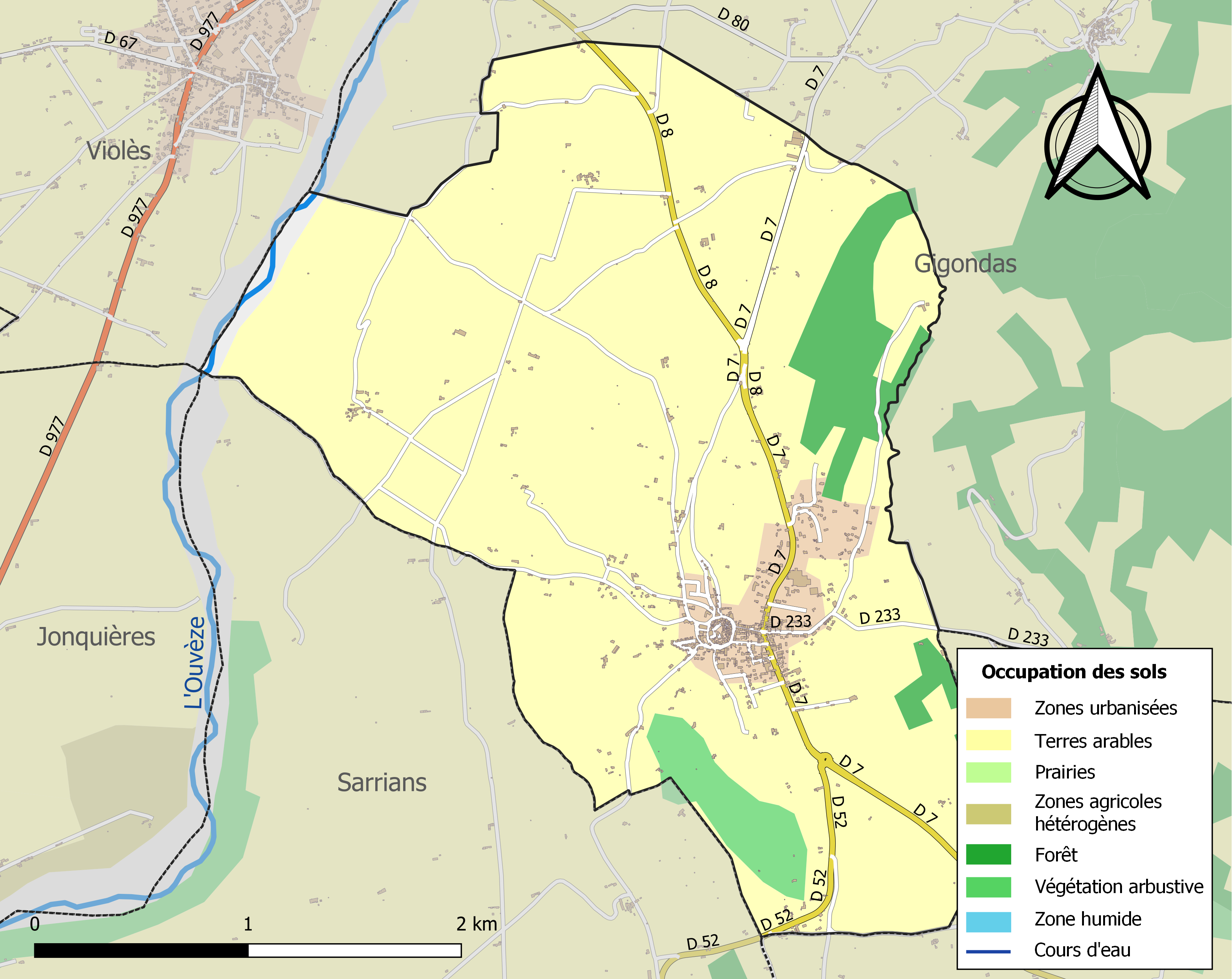
Map of infrastructure and land use in Vacqueyras

== History ==
=== Prehistory and antiquity ===
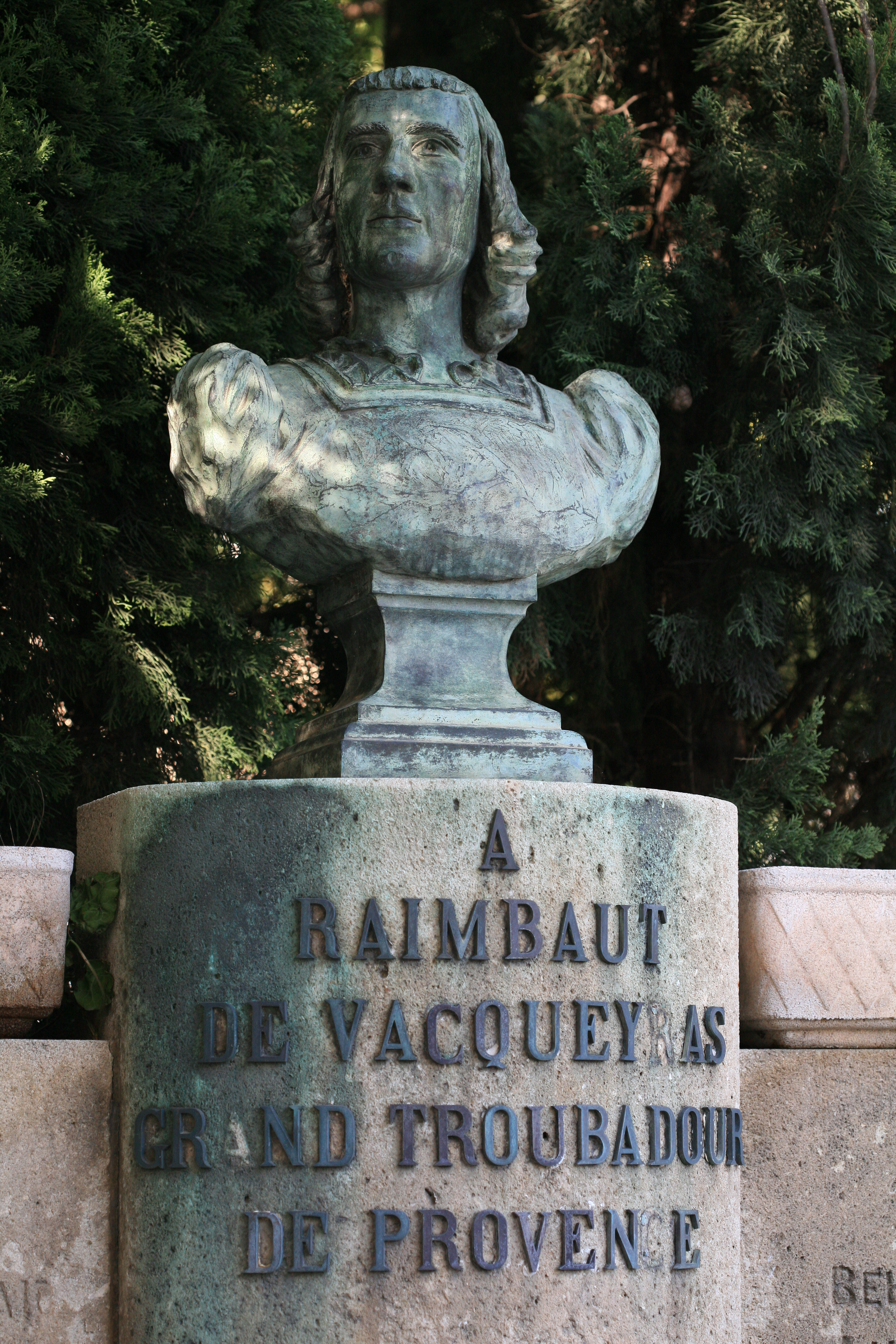
Bust of Raimbaud

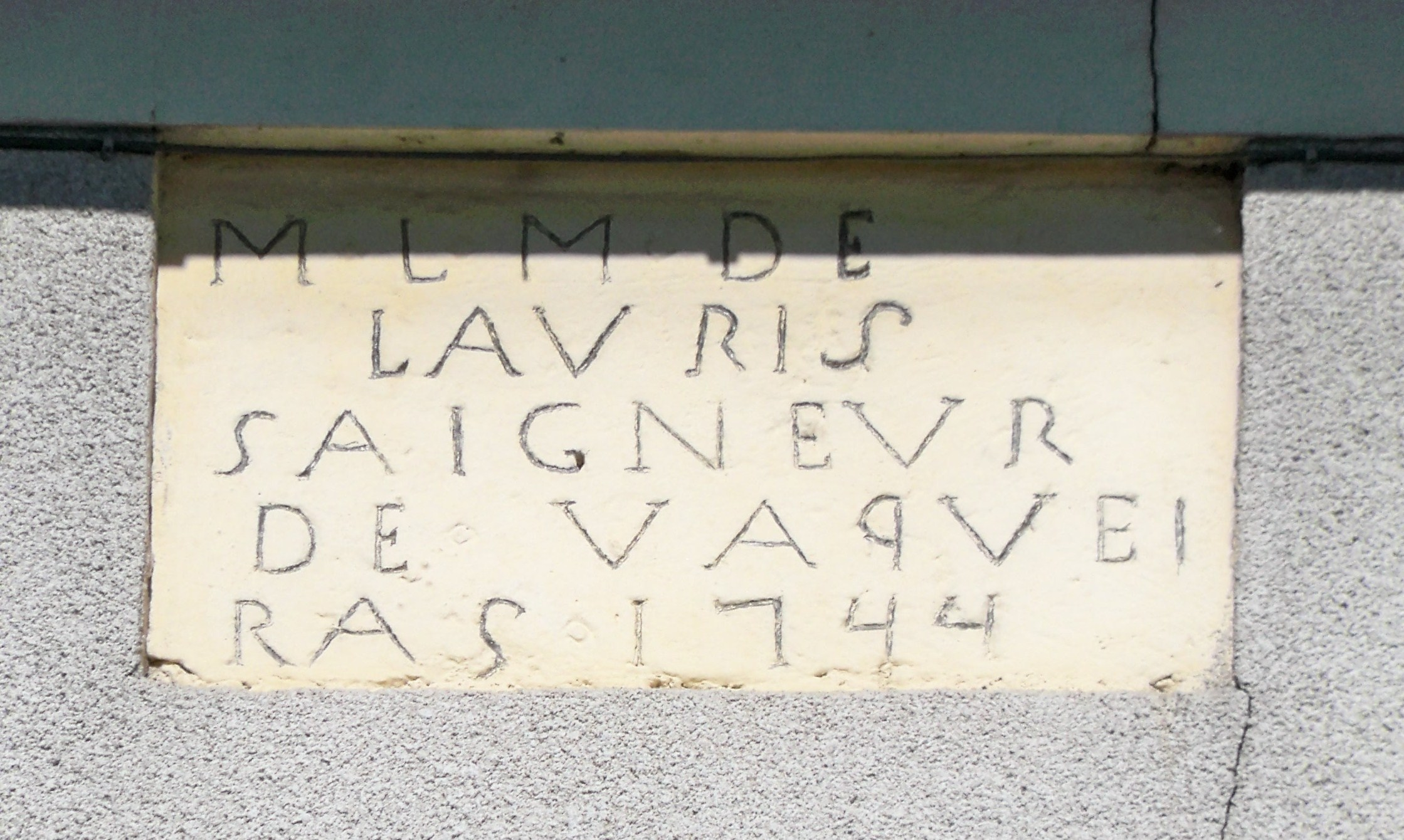
Reused stone bearing the name of Joseph-Mathias de Lauris, 1744.

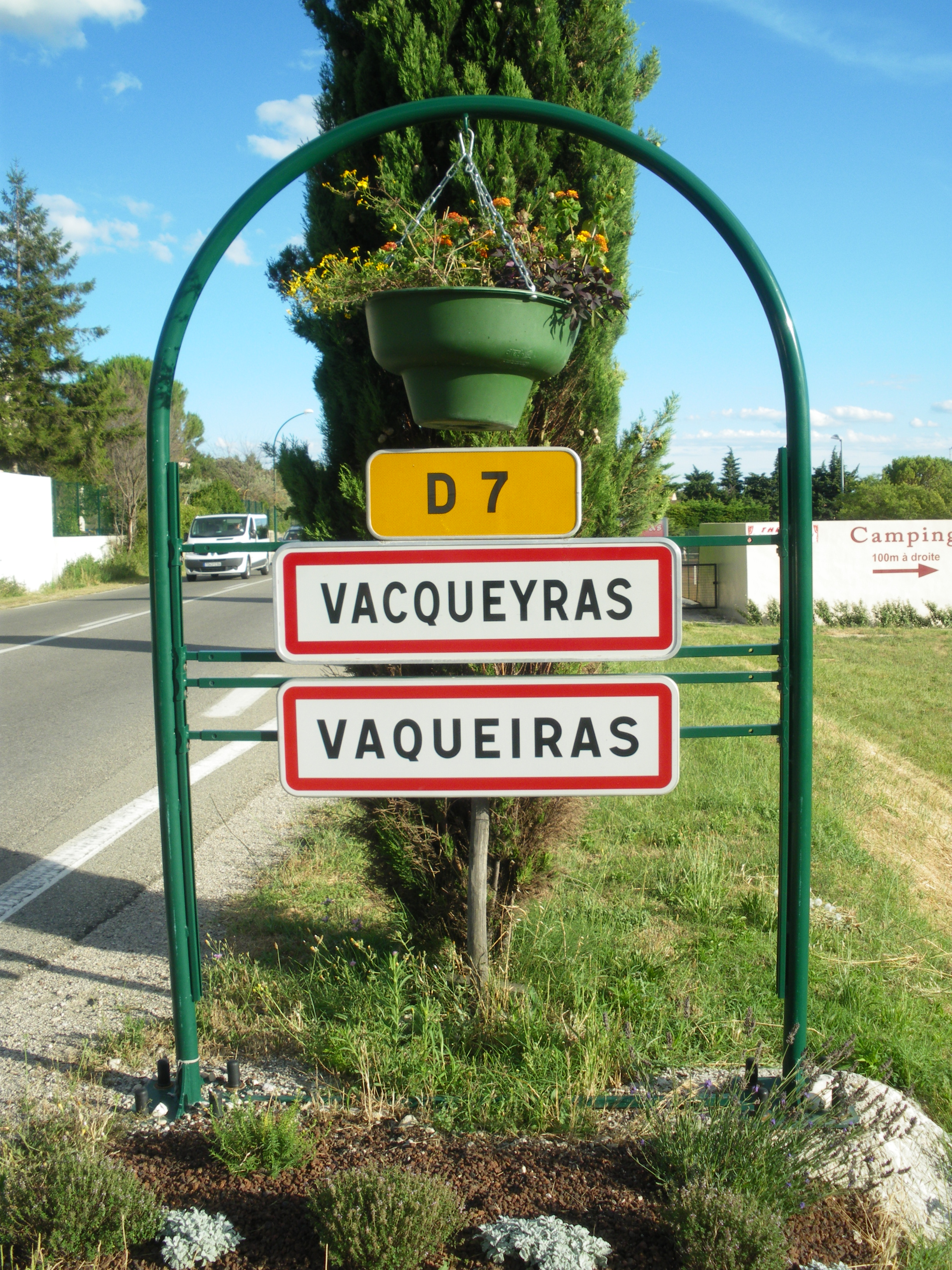
French and Provençal bilingual sign

While prehistory has yielded only a few polished axes, proving the passage but not the habitation of hunter-gatherers, antiquity is richer. Indeed, an altar dedicated to the god Mars by T. Cornelius was unearthed in the Roques district, and fragments of oil lamps and amphorae in the Mornas district.

=== Middle Ages ===
In 1210, a peace treaty ended the border war between Count Raymond of Toulouse, Marquis of Provence, and William des Baux, Prince of Orange. The terms of this agreement stipulated that in exchange for Uchaux, the Count would receive Vacqueyras and its castle. From then on, the town's destiny was intertwined with that of the Comtat Venaissin.

After the Black Death of 1348, a new lord of Vacqueyras and its castle took possession of the castle; he was a member of the Vassadel family. This family would retain the lordship until the end of the 17th century.

=== Modern history ===
In 1688, Alexandre Vassadel married his only daughter, Marie-Charlotte, to Joseph-Mathias de Lauris-Castellane, Marquis of Ampuis. This family would retain its new lordship until the Revolution. But just before, they nearly allied themselves with the "Divine Marquis."

In the early 1760s, the young Marquis de Sade fell in love with the spirited Laure de Lauris-Castellane. But her father, Syndic of the Nobility of the Comtat Venaissin and Lord of Vacqueyras, opposed the marriage. The two families knew each other well, since Joseph-Mathias de Lauris-Castellane had already served as Syndic of the Nobility in 1701, followed, in 1704, by Gaspard-François de Sade.

Forced to break off the relationship, Donatien, furious, wrote to Laure, "There will be no horrors I will commit." He kept his word.

=== Toponym ===
Noting one of the oldest spellings of the town's name, Vaqueiracio (1137), Charles Rostaing suggests the toponym originates from vaquiere (vacca-aria) with the addition of the suffix -acium. Vacairas and Vachairas appear later in 1143, followed by Vacairatio in 1253 and Vaquerrassio in 1360. Gilles Fossat, however, sees it as derived from the Occitan vaquiera, meaning cowshed, with the augmentative suffix -as. This etymology is quite plausible, as cattle breeding is attested in this region in the past, notably in Beaumes-de-Venise.

Another hypothesis proposes a compound of the Occitan words val and queiras, the latter referring to a block of stone. In this case, this term would designate the valley of stones, a hypothesis supported by the nearby presence of the village of the place called Les Queirades, from the Occitan queirada, block of squared stone, or land of collapsed stone.

=== Heraldry ===
Arms of Vacqueyras	Barry of silver and gules, on a chief of the same, charged with two keys, one gold, the other silver, crossed in saltire.

== Population ==
Historical population
Year	Pop.	±% p.a.
1968	866	—
1975	816	−0.85%
1982	883	+1.13%
1990	943	+0.83%
1999	1,061	+1.32%
2007	1,060	−0.01%
2012	1,085	+0.47%
2017	1,308	+3.81%
2023	1,179	−1.72%
Source: INSEE

== Economy ==
=== The vineyard and the wines ===
Thanks to its remarkable terroir, which slopes down from the foothills of the Dentelles de Montmirail to high garrigue of rolled pebbles, this vineyard produces red, rosé, and white wines. Their vinification is carried out by a group of producers and by independent wineries (numbering 35).

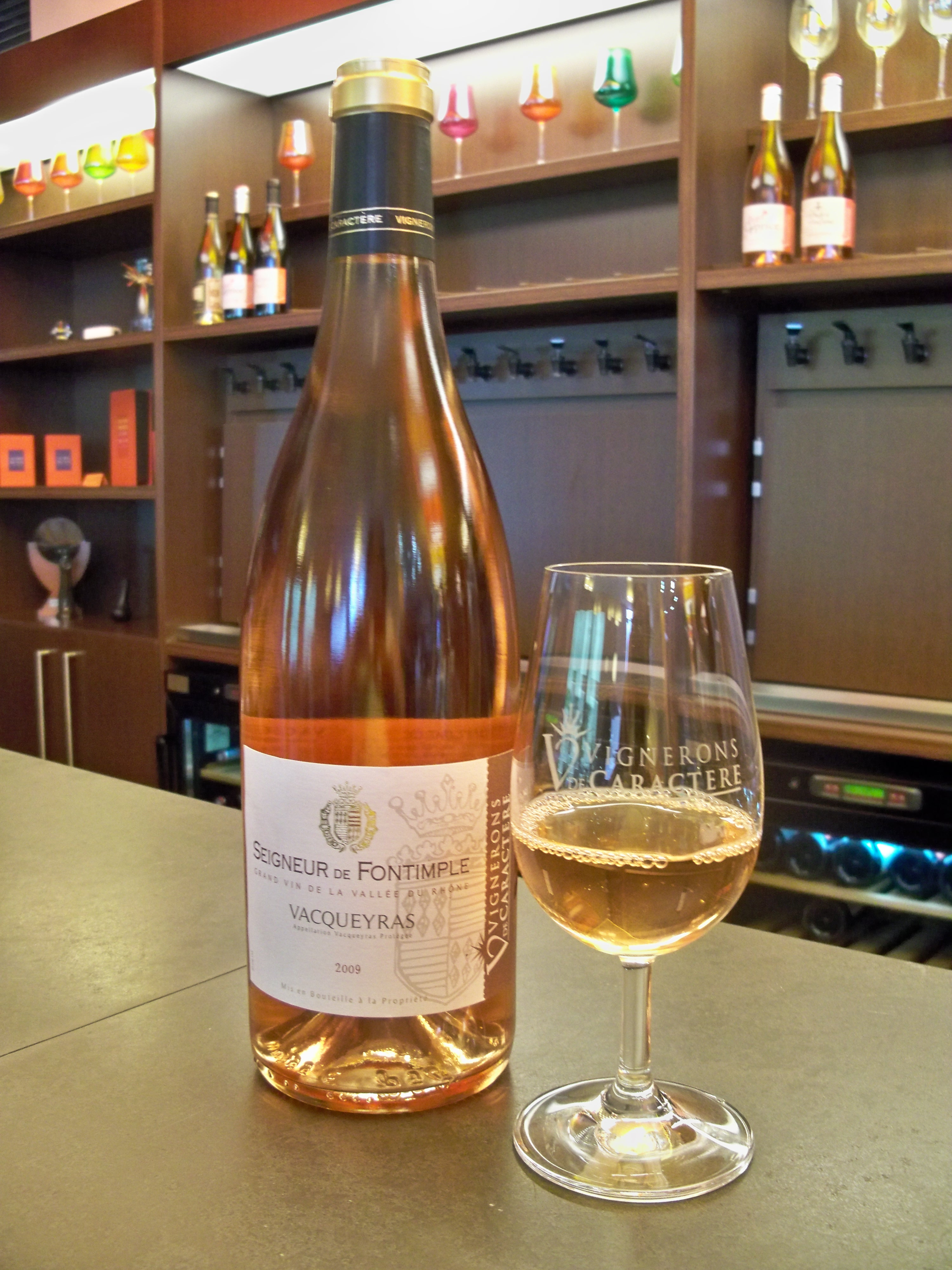
AOC Vacqueyras rosé

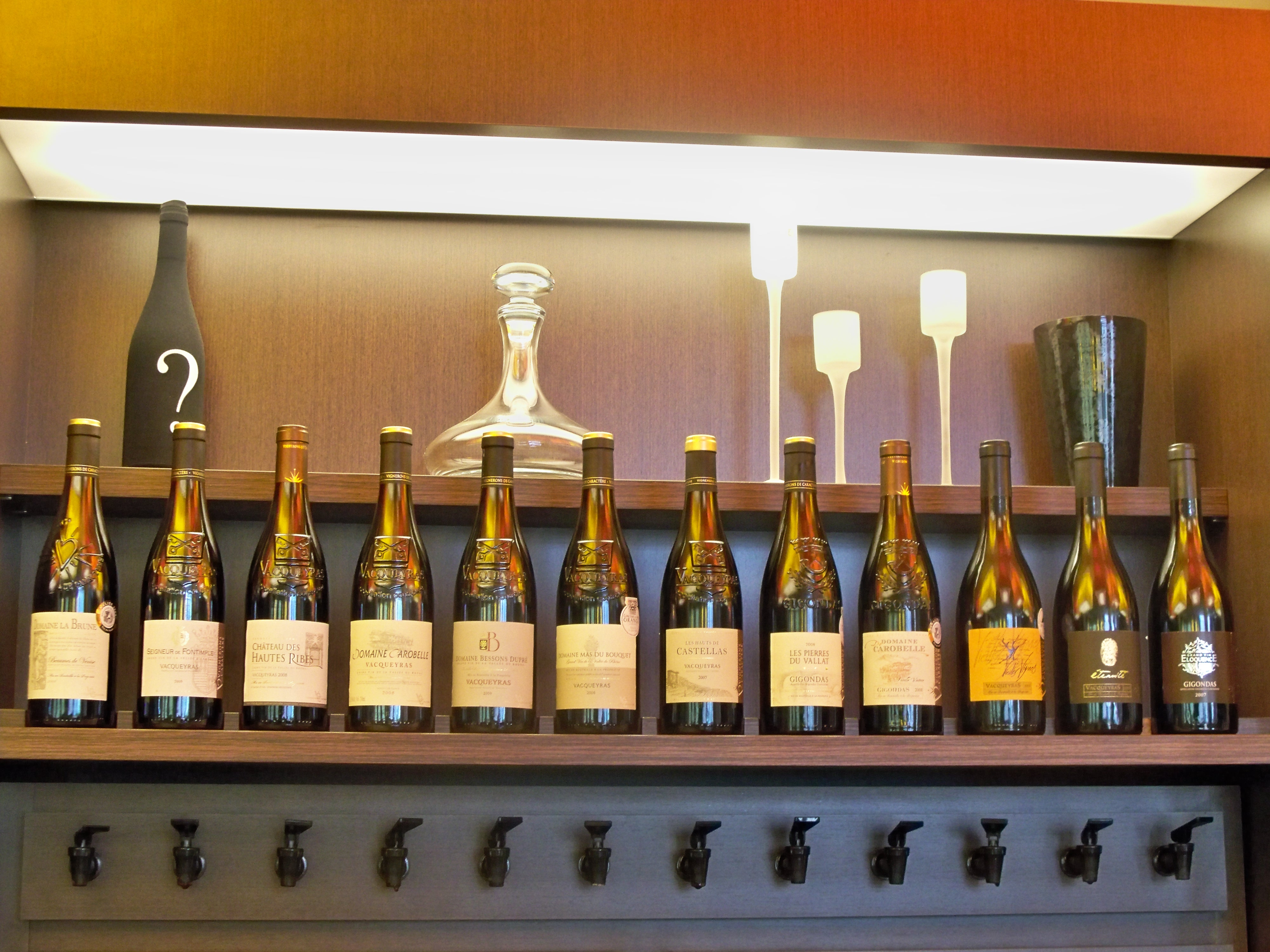
Range of Vacqueyras AOC wines

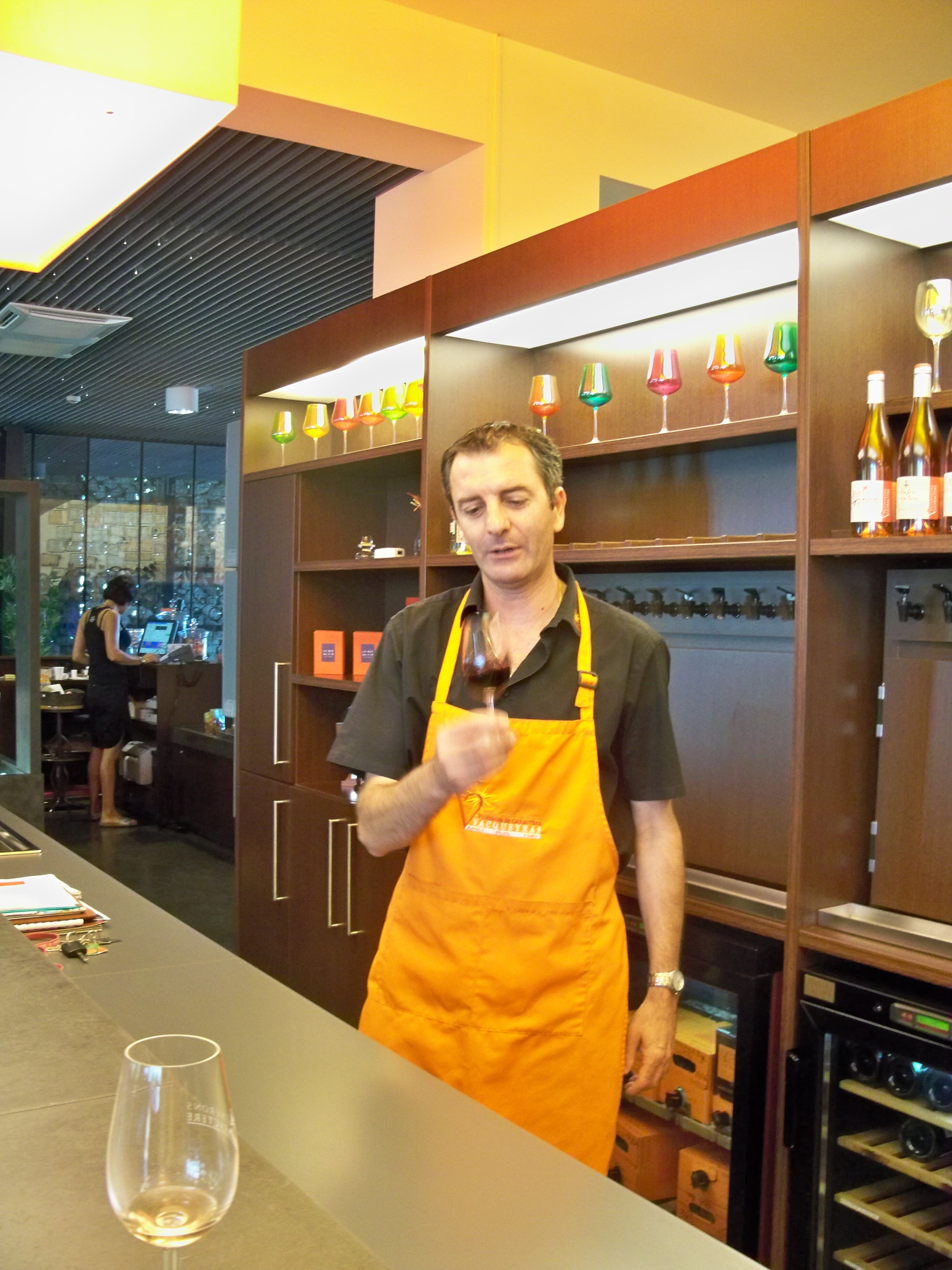
Wine tasting in the cellar

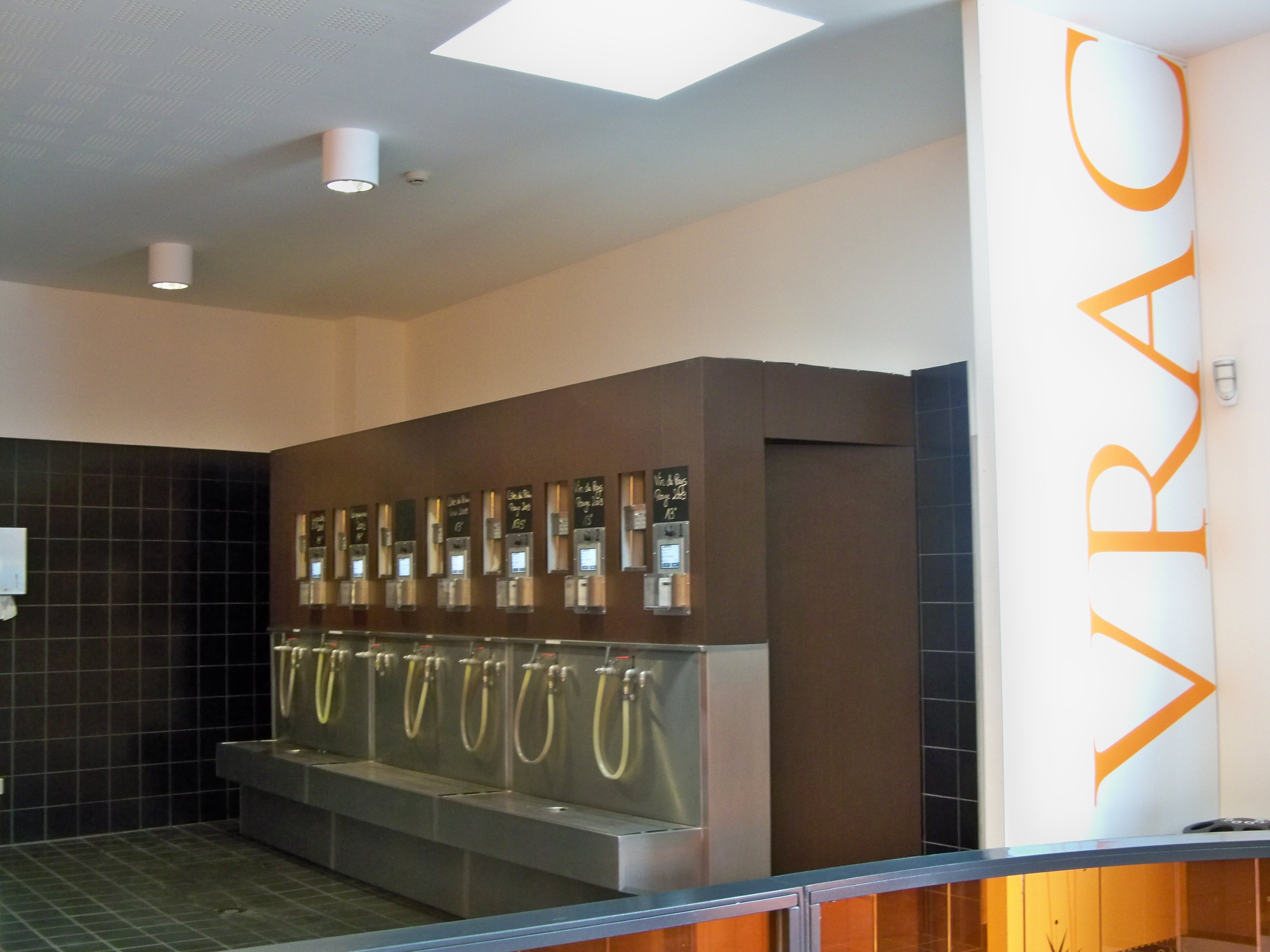
Wine for sale at the cellar door

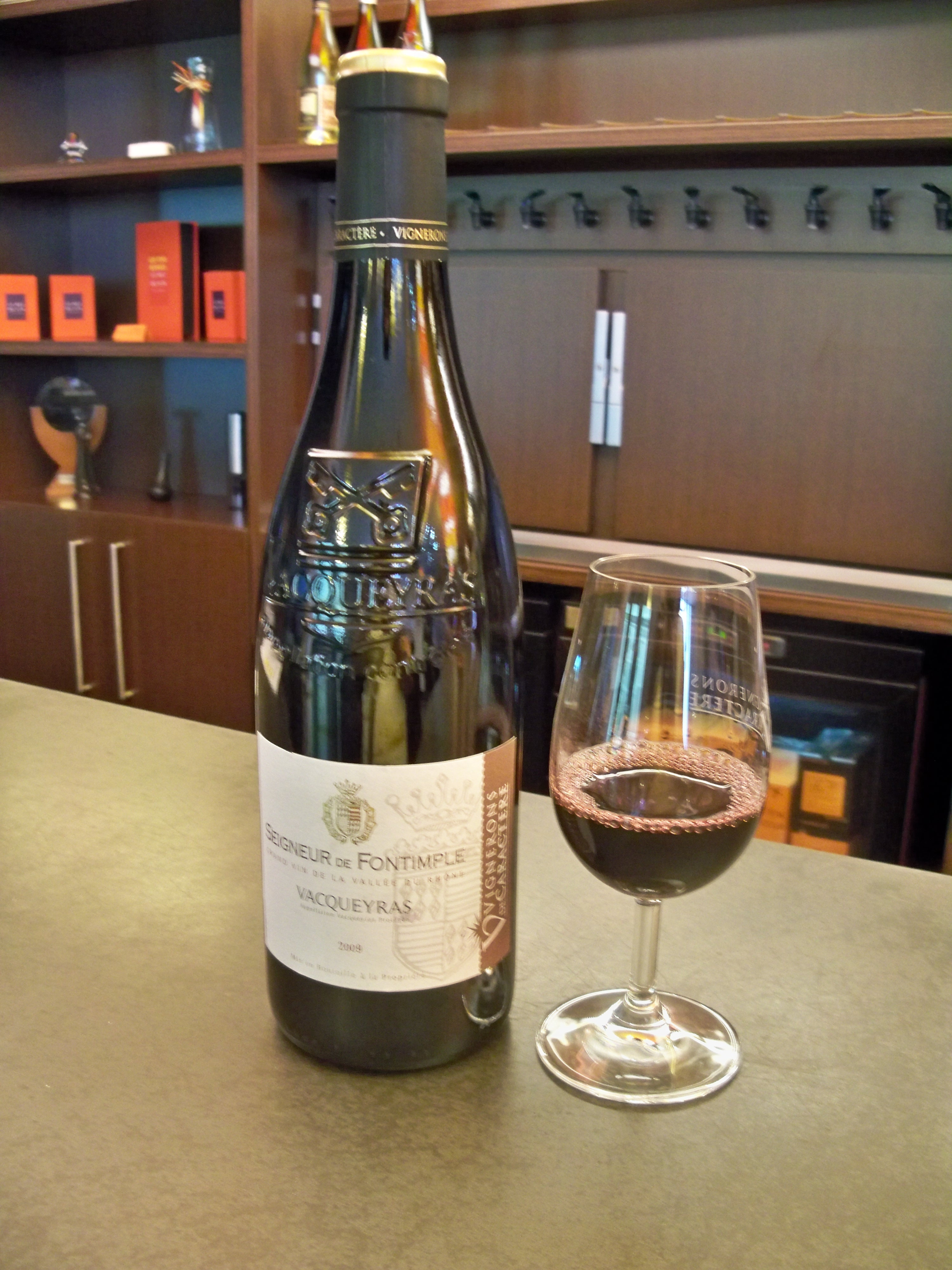
AOC Vacqueyras red

=== Tourism ===
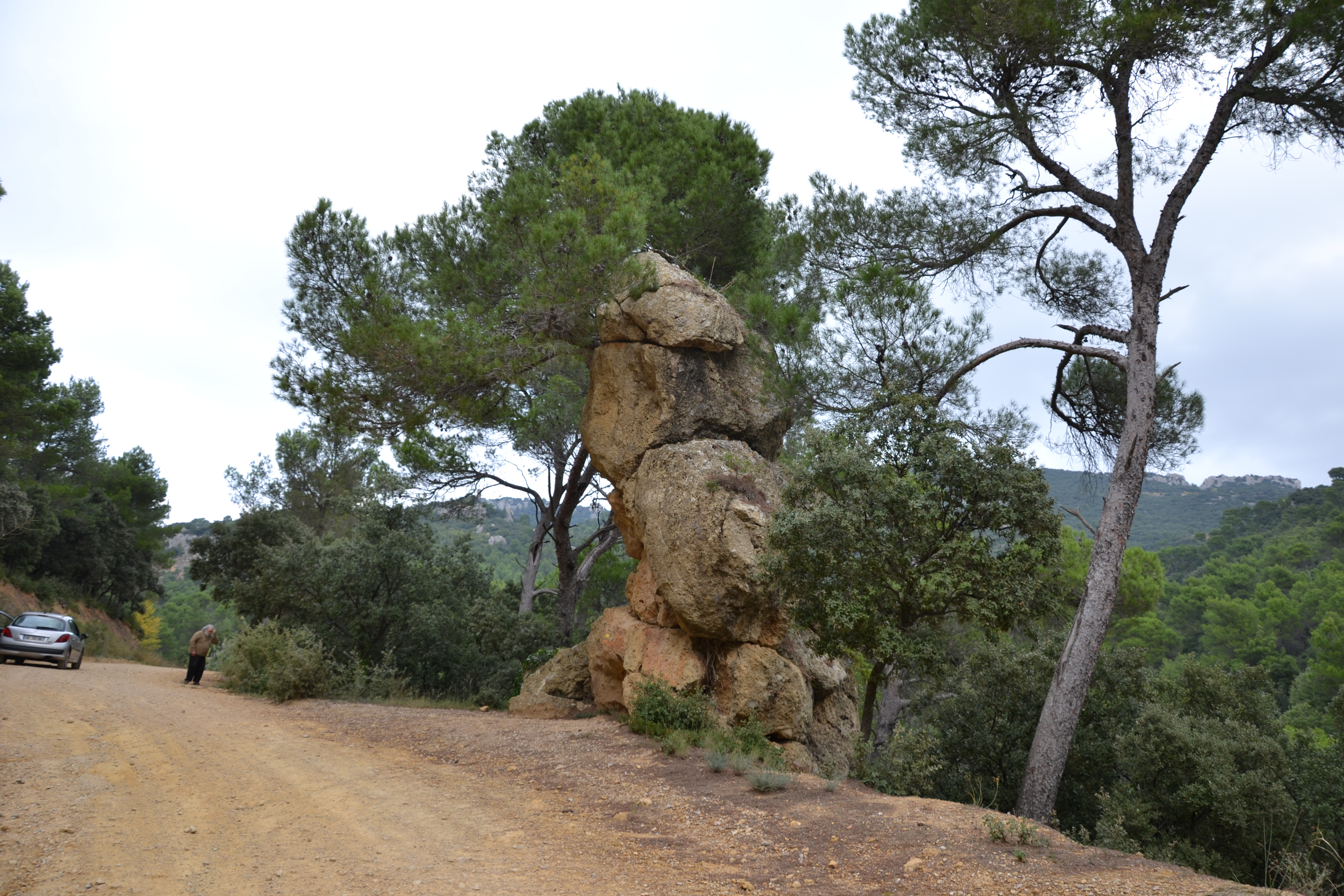
Vacqueyras Menhir

The appeal of this commune's wines has fostered wine tourism. Numerous wineries offer tastings of their ranges.

A road leads from the village, eventually becoming a track suitable for vehicles, providing access to old red gypsum mines, the "Chambre du Turc" (Turk's Chamber), and the foot of the Dentelles de Montmirail mountain range, passing by the Vacqueyras menhir.

There is a tourist information office, several hotels, bed and breakfasts, guesthouses, and a campsite.

== Equipment or services ==
=== Urban transport ===
The village is served morning and evening by a bus line linking Vaison-la-Romaine to Carpentras.

=== Education ===
There is a primary school.

=== Sports ===
Football team and stadium, tennis club.

Several hiking, cycling, and mountain biking trails.

Climbing site in the Dentelles de Montmirail.

=== Health ===
There is a pharmacy in the center of the village and a doctor.

== Local life ==
=== Entertainment, festivals and competitions ===
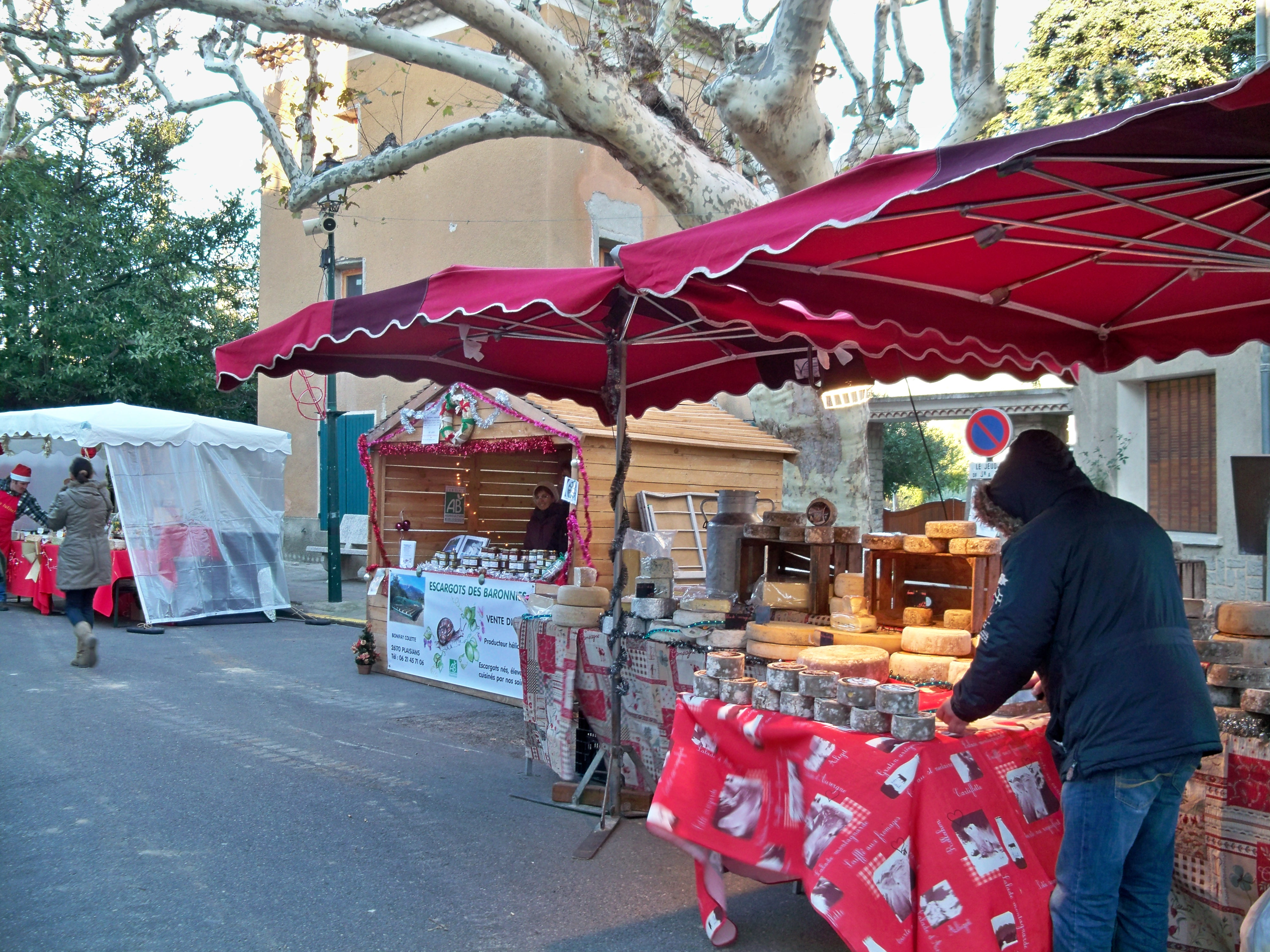
Christmas market

Since 1987, in early June, the wine competition has welcomed amateur tasters from around the world and awarded prestigious prizes in the form of the "Golden Raimbaud" and "Silver Raimbaud."

At the end of June, the "Legs of Bacchus" takes place, a walking tour through the local vineyards.

During July, the village hosts the "Festival of Boulevard Comedy," whose high-quality plays attract a large audience.

The Wine Festival is a major event held every July 13 and 14, featuring the most prestigious wine producers of the Rhône Valley.

The village festival takes place in mid-August, and a Christmas Market is held in mid-December.

Flower Market.

=== Environment ===
Peyre communal woodland.

The municipality is included in the Natura 2000 protected area "Ouvèze and Toulourenc," under the auspices of the Ministry of Ecology, the DREAL Provence-Alpes-Côte d'Azur, and the MNHN (Natural Heritage Service).

=== Ecology and recycling ===
Collection and treatment of household waste and similar waste, and protection and enhancement of the environment within the Ventoux-Comtat Venaissin agglomeration community.

== Monuments and sights ==
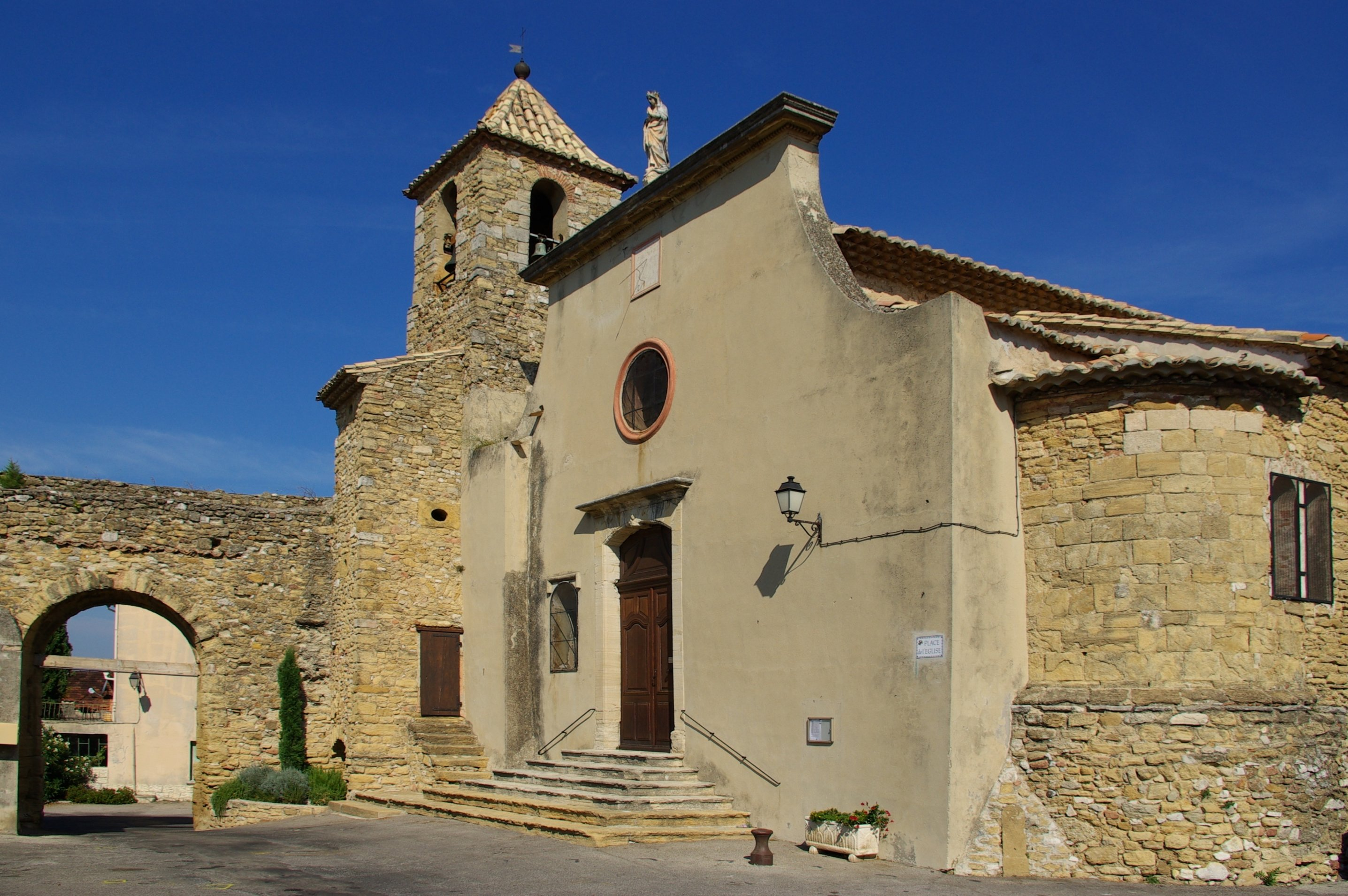
Saint-Barthélemy Church in Vacqueyras

=== Saint-Barthélemy Church ===
Located at the top of the village within the ramparts, it is of Romanesque origin. It was first enlarged in the 17th century, and then again in the 19th century. This transformation in 1853 profoundly altered and disoriented it.

=== The Notre-Dame chapels ===
The construction of the Notre-Dame-de-Pitié chapel was decided upon during the plague epidemic of 1628-1629. The town council's decision was made on February 8, 1630, with a vow to commission a silver reliquary for the arm of Saint Placid in the parish church.

The Consuls were authorized at the meeting of September 21, 1632, to begin work on the rocky spur of Coste de Coa. This authorization was confirmed a second time on May 6, 1633, with a mandate to "continue the work until it is completed."

The chapel was completed in 1655. On May 25, the Parliament of the village decided to "beseech His Most Illustrious and Reverend Lordship Bishop of Orange or His Vicar General to grant the Vicar of this place the right to bless the newly built chapel of Coste de Coa and a section of land adjoining it intended for use as a cemetery."

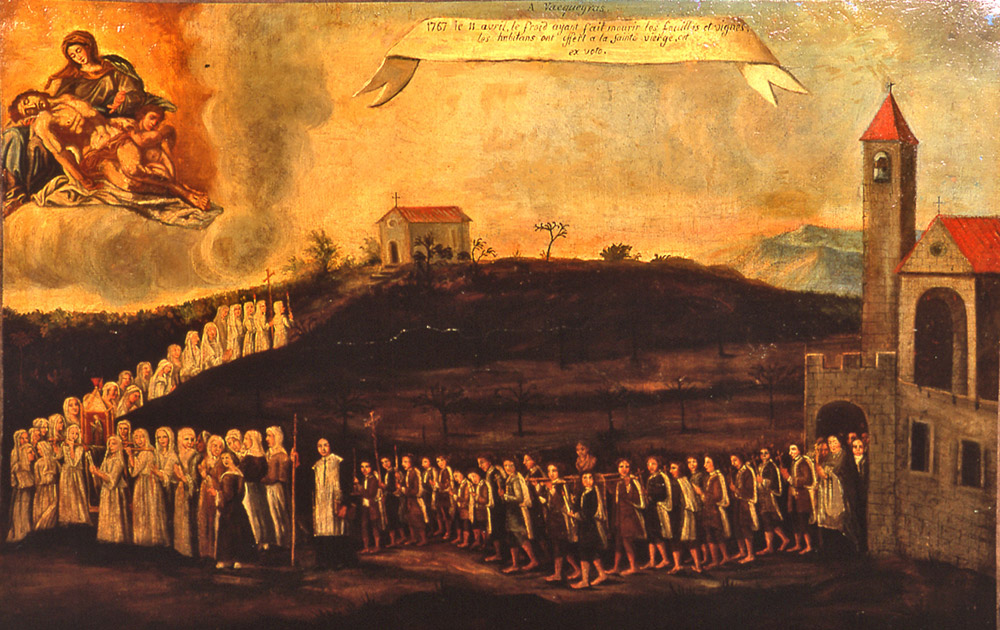
Ex-voto from 1767 to Our Lady of Pity to save the vines

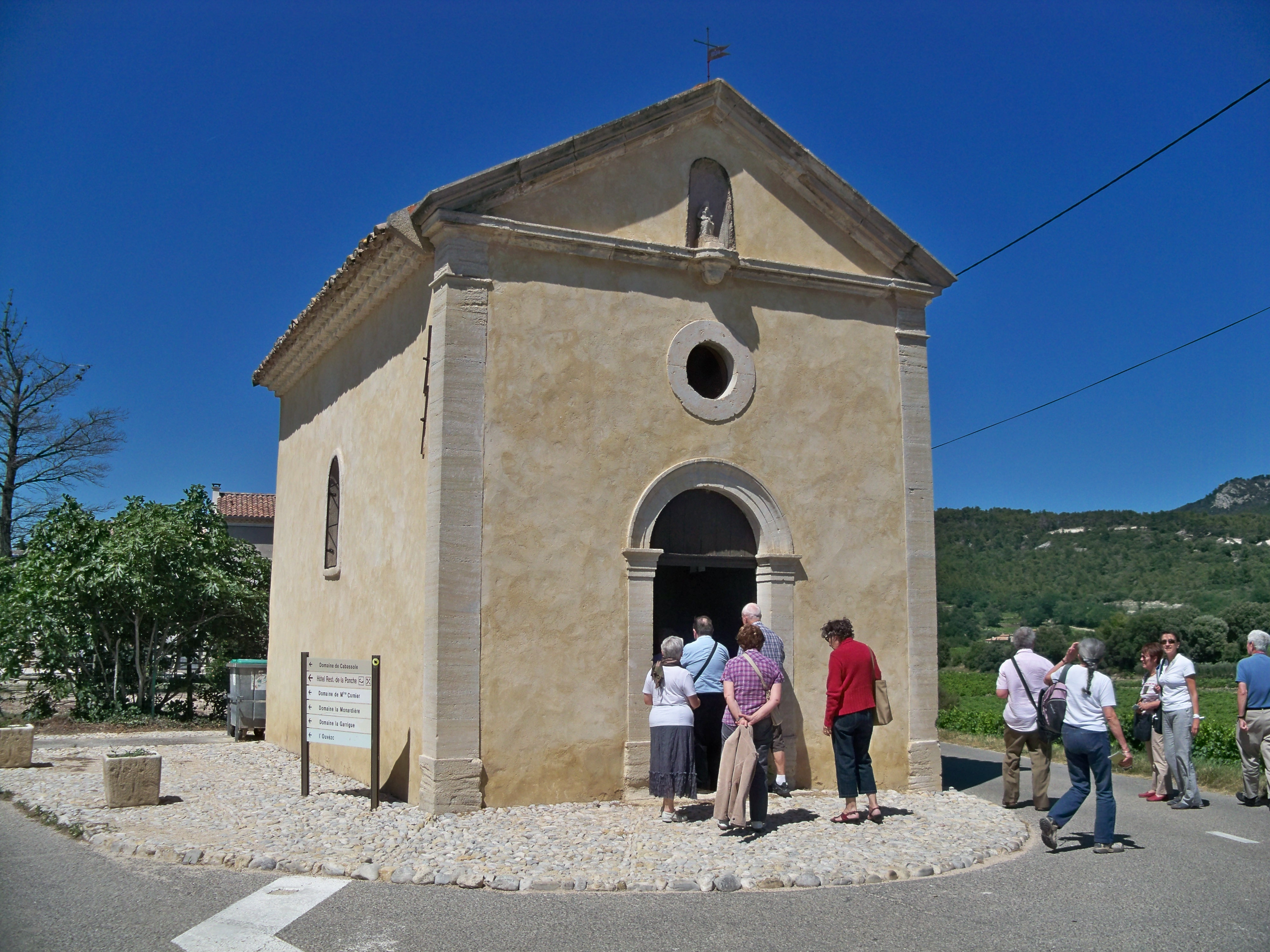
Notre-Dame-de-la-Brune Chapel

The chapel was indeed fully completed on June 10 and consecrated on August 16th, the feast day of Saint Roch.

It became a place of pilgrimage during the Great Plague of 1720. A painting in the form of a votive offering, above the high altar, commemorated the procession of April 11, 1767, which took place there to implore the Virgin Mary after the cold had killed people and vines. It was removed and placed in safekeeping at the end of the 20th century.

The Notre-Dame-de-la-Brune chapel has a different history. More recent, its construction began in 1870.

=== The Chapel of Saint-Pape ===
Saint Pape was the patron saint of the Agacines. A chapel was built starting in 1655 on the site of an ancient Calvary and was dedicated to him on March 16, 1662, his feast day.

From then on, this "saint who was good for something" had his sanctuary, which was always full. Every Sunday, after the Ite missa est, while the priest recited the last Gospel, the disabled would dip their feet in holy water and then rub their corns and calluses against a rough step of the staircase leading to the high altar.

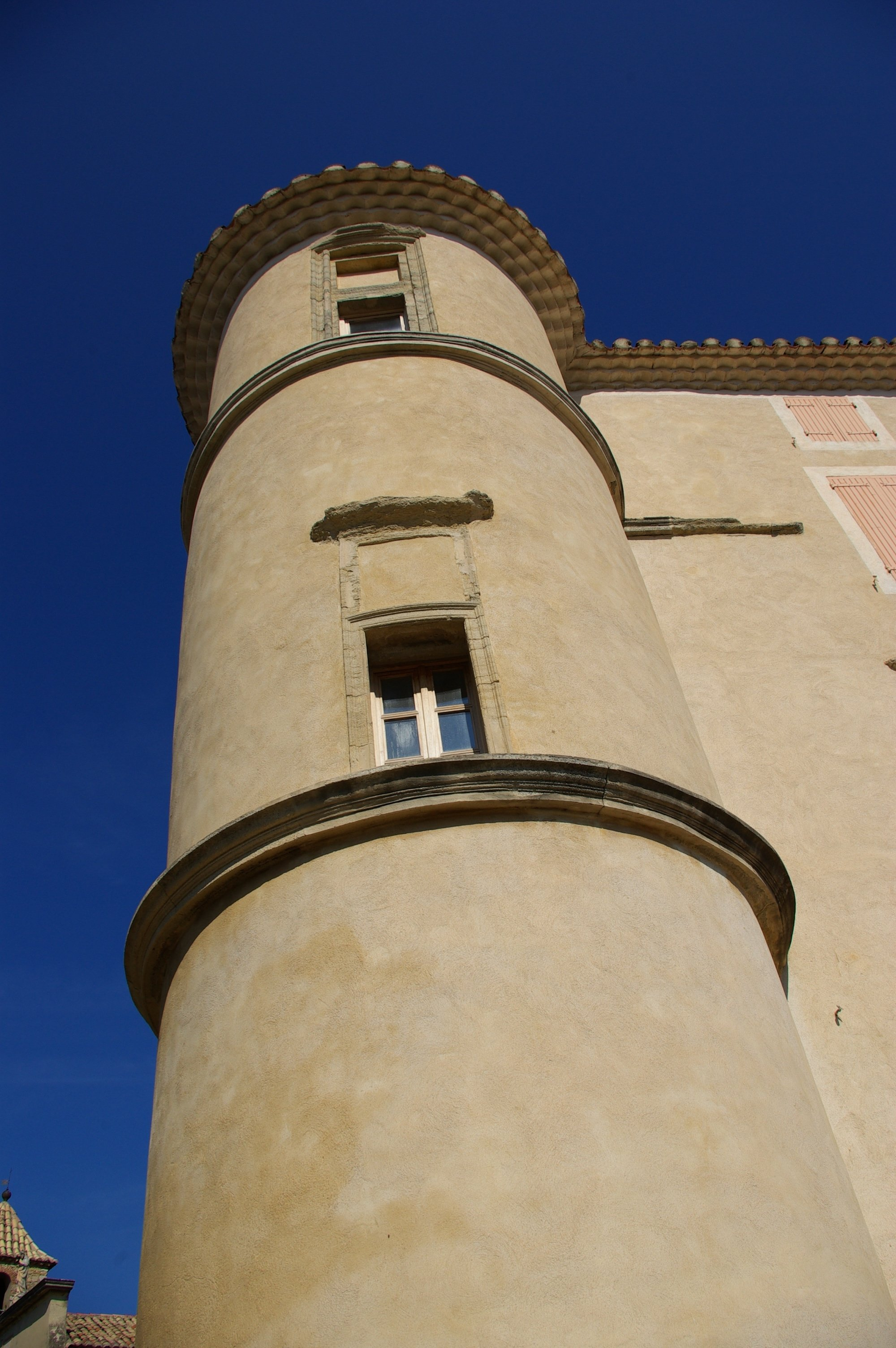
Tower of the Vassadel castle.

Numerous instances of relief and healing were recorded. Unfortunately, the chapel was destroyed, and even its location has been lost to collective memory. However, the Saint-Pape district and the Grand Vallat de Saint-Pape still exist.

Throughout the 17th century, this unusual first name was given ten times, as evidenced by baptismal records. Then, after the Revolution, it fell completely out of favor.

=== The castle ===
This is not the one that was placed under the care of Raimbaut de Vaqueiras' father. The latter certainly had its foundations nearby, since a large stone structure, believed to be the remains of the medieval castle, is still visible on the right side of the "Château Square," at the beginning of a lane leading down to the lower part of the village.

The current castle was built during the 16th century and then restored in the 17th century. The retaining walls, a tower pierced with gun ports, and a lower hall with a pointed arch vault remain from the original building. The rest of the structure was remodeled over the centuries by the Vassadel family, who owned the property from 1349 to 1688.

The current building, owned by the diocese, dates from the 19th century.

=== The old ramparts ===
During the 14th and 15th centuries, the village was surrounded by fortifications reinforced by square towers and bordered by a moat. Although this moat was filled in 1830, a section of the ramparts remains, accessed through a gate that leads to the square where the church and the castle are located.

=== Stassart courtyard and its porch ===
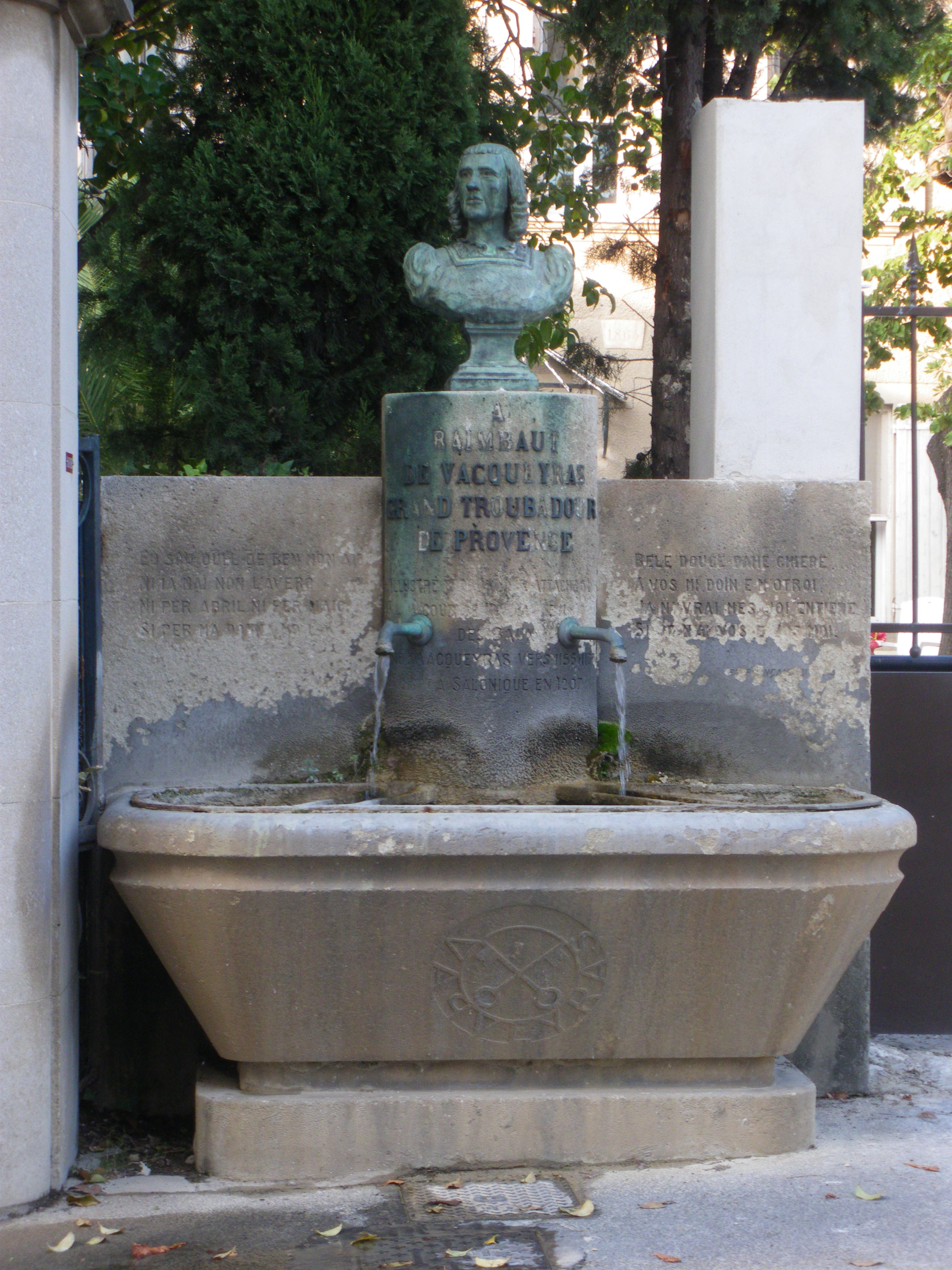
Raimbaut fountain

The Cours Stassart owes its name to a prefect of Vaucluse, appointed by Napoleon III, who had the foresight to plant the plane trees that still shade this thoroughfare. The archway, which provides access to the upper part of the village, was the only gate in the medieval village walls until 1760.

The fountains, which were also former wash houses, are still located on the southern part of the Cours.

=== Raimbaut fountain ===
The Raimbaut fountain, built in 1866, features a bust of Raimbaut inaugurated in 1899 in the presence of Frédéric Mistral. His bust, stolen along with that of Baron Leroy de Boiseaumarié from Sainte-Cécile-les-Vignes, has been recreated identically and put back in place.

=== Former thermal spa of Montmirail ===
He operated the Montmirail spring, which was in operation from May 26, 1859 to 1939. Although located in the commune of Gigondas, it was only accessible by road from Vacqueyras.

== The hamlet of Fontbonne ==
It formed a Vacqueyras enclave within the commune of Sarrians as early as the Middle Ages. It was here that Abbot Henri Michel-Reyne, parish priest of Vacqueyras, discovered the "Fontbonne Stone," bearing both Bronze Age cup marks, the papal coat of arms, and the arms of Julian of Rovere, the future Julius II.

In his book "Wines of the Rhône Valley: A guide to origins", Robert W. Mayberry published a photograph of a wine vat, dug and lined with masonry in the basement of one of the hamlet's houses, and dated 1739.

The "Chapel of the Granges de l'Ouvèze" also stood here, consecrated on June 2, 1658, under the patronage of Saint Denis (Sancti Dionysos). It was likely a private chapel belonging to the Gaudibert family. Three times, with the special permission of the Bishop of Orange, the weddings of the daughters of this house were celebrated there. First, Madeleine, on February 8, 1684, then her sister Marie, on September 4, 1684, and finally another Marie, daughter of the viguier Joseph Gaudibert, on February 17, 1767.

== See also ==
- Dentelles de Montmirail
- Communes of the Vaucluse department
- Vacqueyras AOC
- Raimbaut de Vaqueiras
