= Beaumes-de-Venise =

- Commune
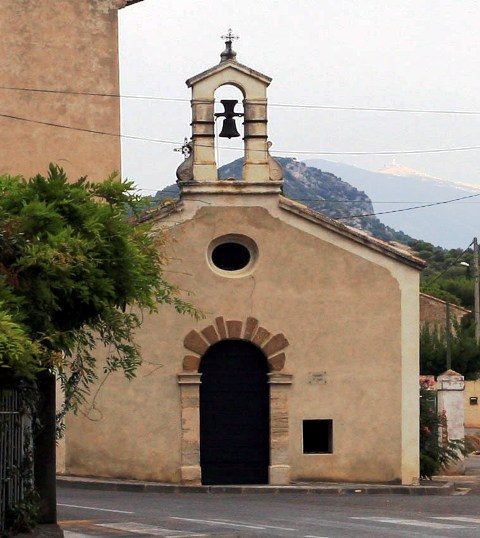
- Chapel with Mont Ventoux in the background

- Coat of arms
- Location of Beaumes-de-Venise
- Location within France Location within Provence-Alpes-Côte d'Azur
- Coordinates: 44°07′25″N 5°01′52″E
- Country: France
- Region: Provence-Alpes-Côte d'Azur
- Department: Vaucluse
- Arrondissement: Carpentras
- Canton: Monteux
- Intercommunality: CA Ventoux-Comtat Venaissin

Government
  - Mayor (2020–2026): Jérôme Bouletin
- Area^{1}: 18.89 km^{2} (7.29 sq mi)
- Elevation: 100 m (330 ft)
- Highest elevation: 442 m (1,450 ft)
- Lowest elevation: 44 m (144 ft)
- Population (2023): 2,442
  - Density: 129.3/km^{2} (334.8/sq mi)
- Time zone: UTC+01:00 (CET)
  - Summer (DST): UTC+02:00 (CEST)
- INSEE/Postal code: 84012 /84190
- ^{1} French Land Register data, which excludes lakes, ponds, glaciers > 1 km^{2} (0.386 sq mi or 247 acres) and river estuaries.

Beaumes-de-Venise (French pronunciation: [bom də vəniz]; Occitan: Baumas de Venisa) is a commune in the Vaucluse department in the Provence-Alpes-Côte d'Azur region in southeastern France.

== Name ==
The word "beaumes" comes from the Provençal word bauma meaning "cave" or "grotto". The surrounding hills have many of these caves that were inhabited during the Iron Age.

== Population ==
Historical population
Year	Pop.	±% p.a.
1968	1,484	—
1975	1,631	+1.36%
1982	1,721	+0.77%
1990	1,784	+0.45%
1999	2,051	+1.56%
2007	2,238	+1.10%
2012	2,388	+1.31%
2017	2,409	+0.18%
2023	2,442	+0.23%
Source: INSEE

== Wine ==
The village gives its name to a sweet wine appellation, Muscat de Beaumes-de-Venise. It also gives its name to a drier red wine, formerly Côtes du Rhone Villages Beaumes-de-Venise, now Beaumes de Venise AOC.

== See also ==
- Dentelles de Montmirail
- Communes of the Vaucluse department
