= Canton of Mormoiron =

Coordinates: 44°04′28″N 5°10′59″E

Mormoiron
- Former canton
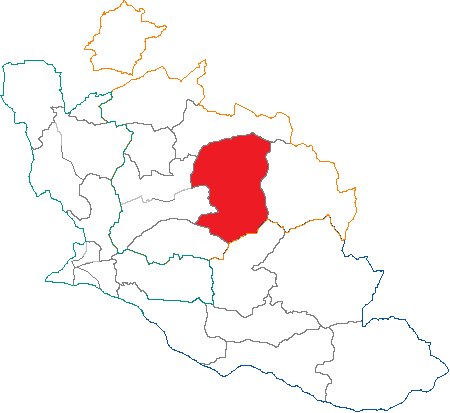
- Country: France
- Region: Provence-Alpes-Côte d'Azur
- Department: Vaucluse
- No. of communes: {{{nbcomm}}}
- Disbanded: 2015
- Area: 249.59 km^{2} (96.37 sq mi)
- Population (2012): 10,655
  - Density: 42.690/km^{2} (110.57/sq mi)

The canton of Mormoiron is a French former administrative division in the department of Vaucluse and region Provence-Alpes-Côte d'Azur. It had 10,655 inhabitants (2012). It was disbanded following the French canton reorganisation which came into effect in March 2015. It consisted of 10 communes, which joined the canton of Pernes-les-Fontaines in 2015.

The canton comprised the following communes:

- Bédoin
- Blauvac
- Crillon-le-Brave
- Flassan
- Malemort-du-Comtat
- Méthamis
- Modène
- Mormoiron
- Saint-Pierre-de-Vassols
- Villes-sur-Auzon
