= Canton of Sault =

Coordinates: 44°05′05″N 5°25′53″E

Sault
- Former canton
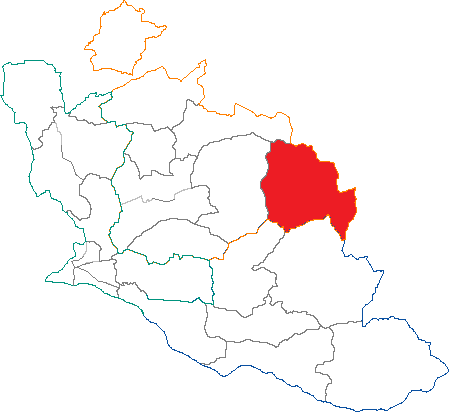
- Country: France
- Region: Provence-Alpes-Côte d'Azur
- Department: Vaucluse
- No. of communes: {{{nbcomm}}}
- Disbanded: 2015
- Area: 249.91 km^{2} (96.49 sq mi)
- Population (2012): 3,374
  - Density: 13.50/km^{2} (34.97/sq mi)

The canton of Sault is a French former administrative division in the department of Vaucluse and region Provence-Alpes-Côte d'Azur. It had 3,374 inhabitants (2012). It was disbanded following the French canton reorganisation which came into effect in March 2015. It consisted of 5 communes, which joined the canton of Pernes-les-Fontaines in 2015.

== Composition ==
The communes in the canton of Sault:

- Aurel
- Monieux
- Saint-Christol
- Saint-Trinit
- Sault
