= Nesque =

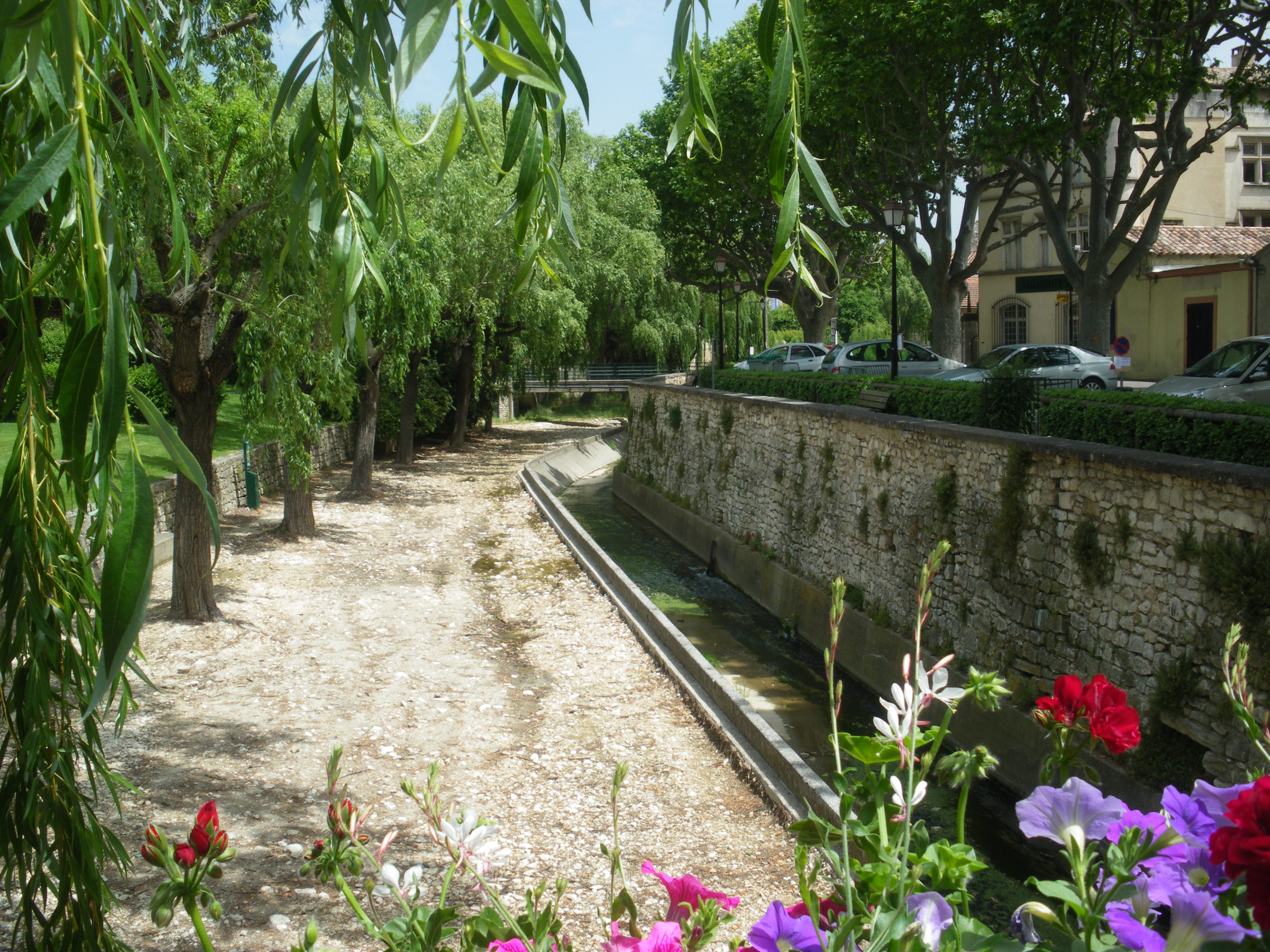
- River Nesque at Pernes-les-Fontaines

- Location within France Location within Provence-Alpes-Côte d'Azur

Location
- Country: France

Physical characteristics
- Source
  - coordinates: 44°07′30″N 5°24′50″E
- Mouth: Sorgue de Velleron
  - coordinates: 43°59′41″N 4°58′55″E
- Length: 53 km (33 mi)
- Basin size: 401 km^{2} (155 sq mi)

Basin features
- Progression: Sorgue de Velleron→ Ouvèze→ Rhône→ Mediterranean Sea

The river Nesque (French: La Nesque) is a river in Provence (France). It flows through Vaucluse department, between Vaucluse Mountains and plains of Comtat Venaissin. A tributary of the Sorgue de Velleron, it is 53.2 km (33.1 mi) long. Its drainage basin is 401 km^{2} (155 sq mi).

== Communes crossing ==
- Aurel
- Méthamis
- Blauvac
- Malemort-du-Comtat
- Venasque
- Saint-Didier
- Pernes-les-Fontaines
