= Research history of Palaeotherium =

Studies of a genus of palaeothere

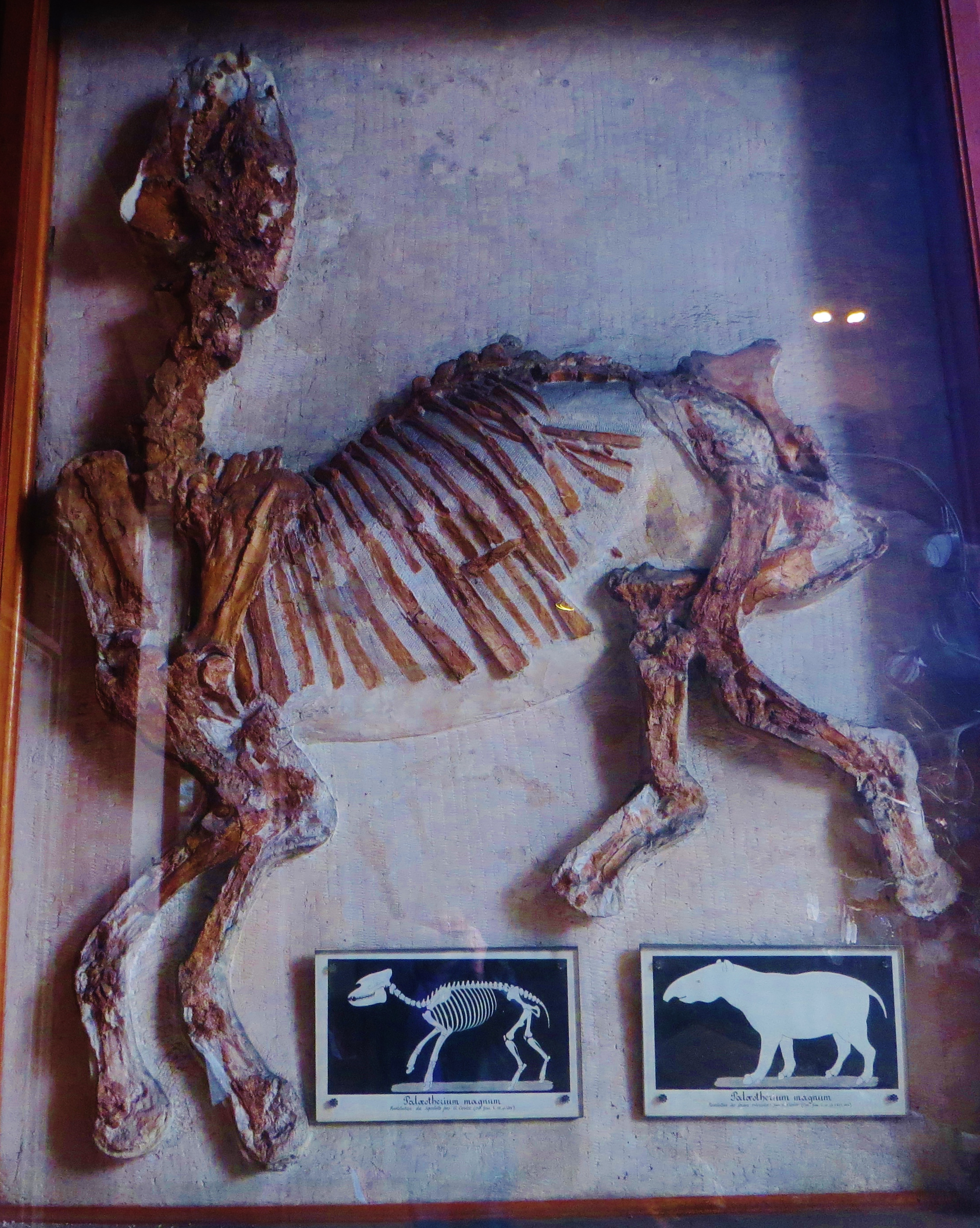
Palaeotherium magnum skeleton, National Museum of Natural History, France

The research history of Palaeotherium is complicated given its extensive fossil record and lengthy taxonomic history, with the earliest record of its fossils dating back to 1782 when the French physicist Robert de Lamanon described the skull of what the naturalist Georges Cuvier described as belonging to P. medium in 1804. Cuvier initially recognized its affinities to tapirs and rhinoceroses and classified fossil material to three different species based on size. From 1805 to 1824, he established additional species based on the morphologies of postcranial remains and drew a reconstructed skeleton of P. magnum in 1824. The fossil mammal genus was the fourth to have been recognized with undisputed taxonomic authority. Palaeotherium had since been a subject of significant attention by many other palaeontologists, and it was gradually revised to be recognized as taxonomically distinct from its other perissodactyl relatives.

Since 1804, many species names, valid or invalid, were erected by European and North American naturalists. Palaeotherium was not known by any complete skeleton until when two different skeletons of P. magnum were uncovered in 1873 and the early 20th century, respectively, within France. The most significant taxonomic revisions were conducted by German palaeontologist Jens Lorenz Franzen, then a graduate student, in 1968 when he synonymized many species names and recognized subspecies within the genus based on morphological variations from different species. Although not as strongly influential in modern culture, it is a well-known taxon within European palaeontology and has been acknowledged as an important find in the history of palaeontology.

== Early research history ==
=== First documentations ===
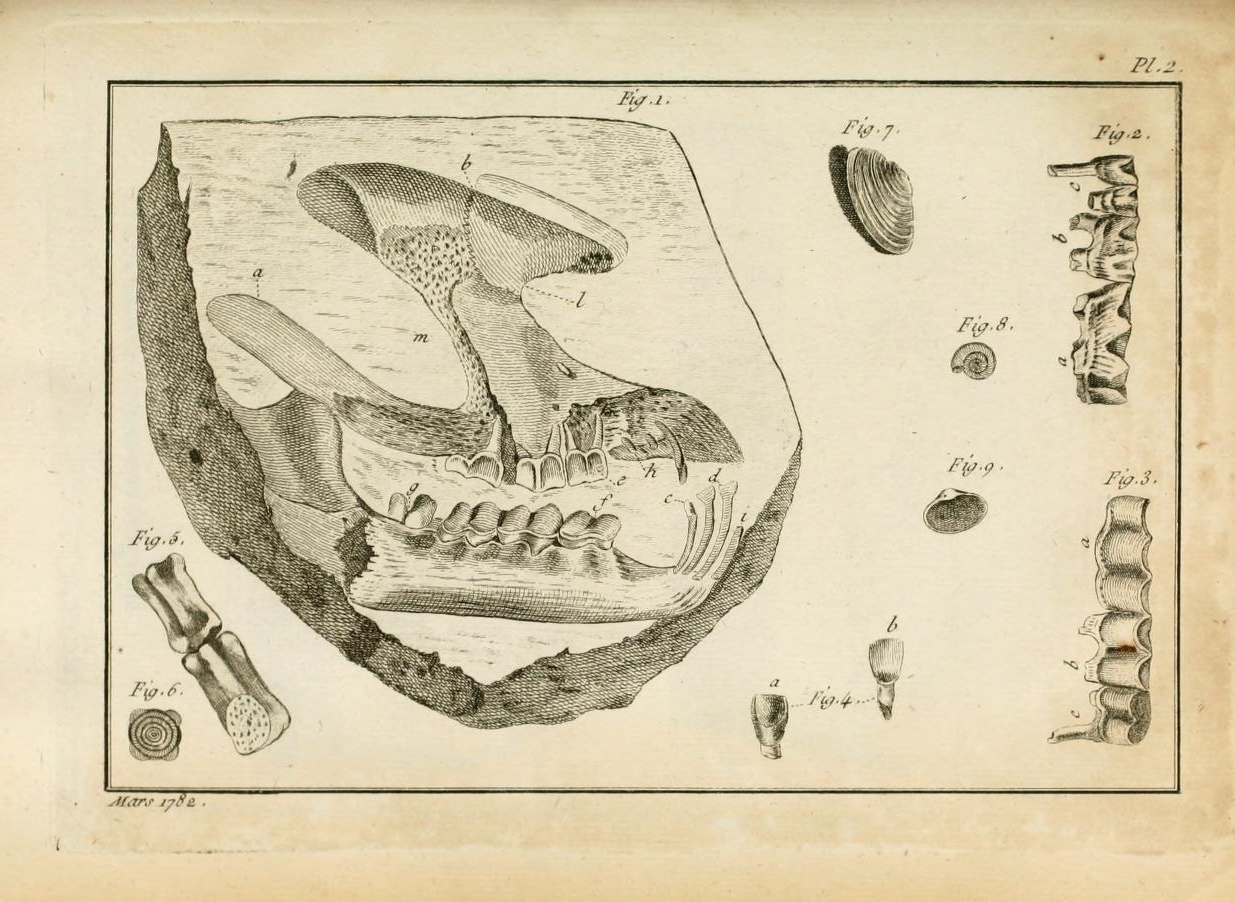
Fossil skull of Palaeotherium medium as illustrated in 1782

The earliest documentation of fossils belonging to Palaeotherium dates back to March 1782 in a scientific journal by the French physicist Robert de Lamanon. The scientist recorded that there were fossils located in the quarries of Montmartre, a large hill near Paris, France. He noted that the fossils were products of animals preserved in deposits that no longer existed. Among the fossils was a skull with both the upper and lower jaws that belonged to the nobleman Philippe-Laurent de Joubert. Lamanon recognized that it had dentition consisting of molars and incisors that were more akin to ruminants than carnivores. Because of the presence of incisors in the fossil animal unlike ruminants and their conical shapes, he hypothesized that the animal had aquatic adaptations but that there are no modern analogues for any extant aquatic animal in terms of dentition. As a result, he proposed the idea that the now-extinct animal was amphibious and fed on both herbs and fish based on the shape of its teeth.

Since 1796, the French naturalist Georges Cuvier innovated the idea of vanished worlds of extinct animals, but as his observations of fossils were mostly limited to drawings and very fragmentary fossil materials stored at the National Museum of Natural History, France, his palaeontological insight remained limited early on. The fossils of Montmartre were credited with great importance to the field of palaeontology, as unlike surface-level taxa such as Mammut and Megatherium, those found near Paris were embedded in deeper and harder sediments, falling between the Pleistocene-aged mammals and the Cretaceous-aged reptiles such as Mosasaurus. In 1798, he documented fossils from Montmartre, amongst various other notable fossils worldwide, the former of which he thought initially could have belonged to the canid genus Canis based on its dentition. Not long after in the same year, he changed his mind and thought that the fossil mammal instead would have been within the order of pachyderms, theorizing that it would have been closest to tapirs and that it would have had trunks like them. He also figured out that the animals of Montmartre were of multiple species with different sizes and numbers of toes.

=== Cuvier's early taxonomy ===
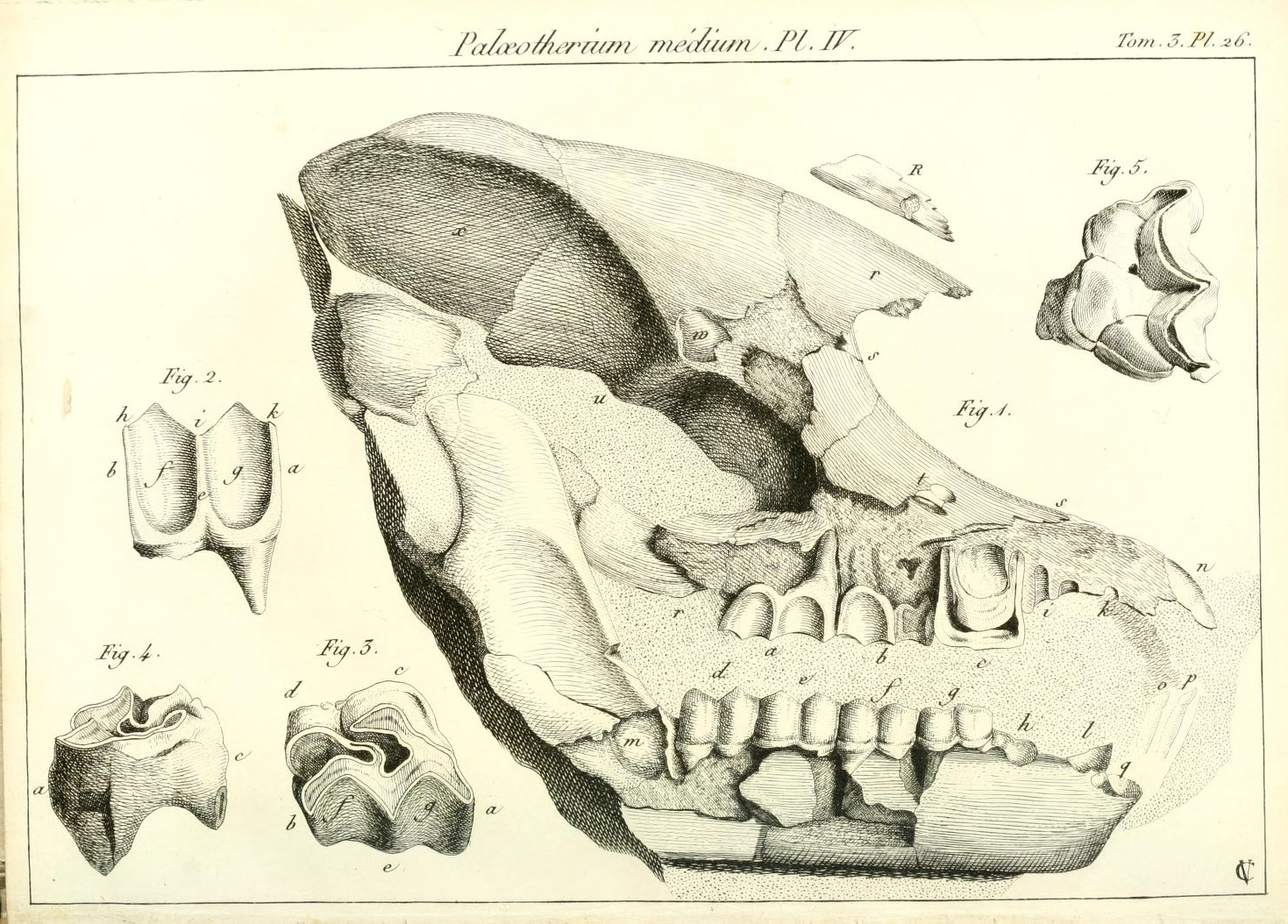
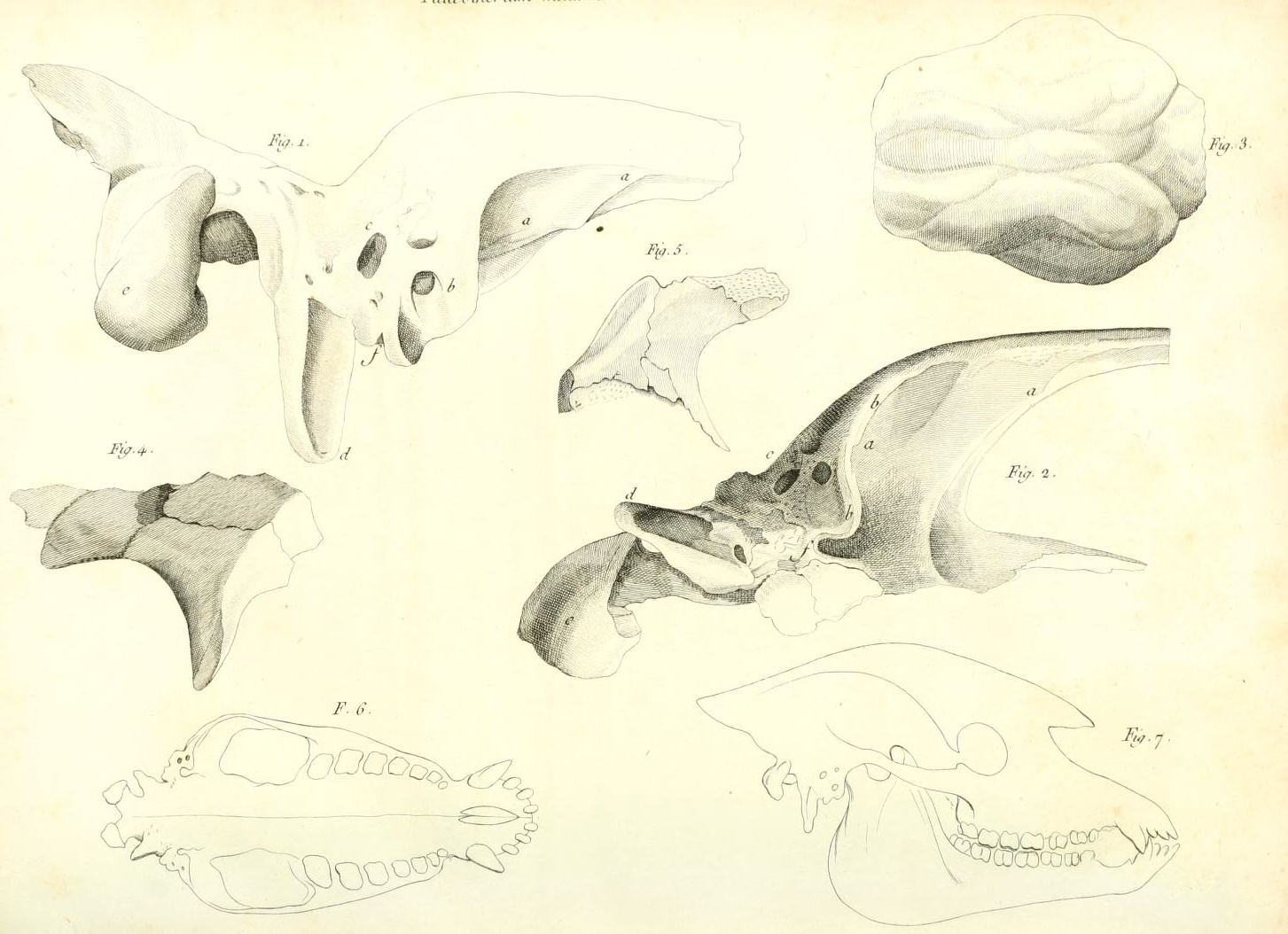
Sketches of the skull fossil of P. medium (left) and reconstructed P. medium skull drawings among other fossil assortments (right)

In 1804, Georges Cuvier described the sets of fossils from the gypsum quarries of the outskirts of Paris (known as the Paris Basin). These fossils were known by Cuvier as early as 1800 but were not formally described yet. He recognized that dentition was critical in ascertaining the dietary and phylogenetic affinities of a given fossil animal. Cuvier pointed out that the fossil molars suggested closer affinities of the fossil mammal to rhinoceroses or hyraxes than ruminants. The naturalist than observed that the fossil dentition came in several different sizes based on his measurements of their circumferences, therefore determining that the jaws in fact belonged to two different species of the same genus. The mammals, according to Cuvier, had complete sets of 28 molars, 4 canines, and 12 incisors. (Note: In the modern day, premolars are defined as separate from molars.) He knew that the mammals would have been herbivorous in nature and thought that the complete dentition would have made it closer in affinity with tapirs but that the molar shapes were similar to those of rhinoceroses. The zoologist therefore established the genus name Palaeotherium and established the first species name Palaeotherium medium. The genus name means "ancient beast," for which the etymology is a compound of the Greek prefix παλαιός ('palaios') meaning 'old' or 'ancient' and the suffix θήρ ('thēr') meaning 'beast' or 'wild animal'.

Cuvier then stated that Palaeotherium must have been a pachyderm intermediate in evolutionary affinity between tapirs and rhinoceroses. He asked a series of questions about the biology of the extinct genus and presented the idea that examining the morphology of its head would help to answer them. The naturalist wrote that there was an important fossil that was first described in a 1782 paper by the late physicist Robert de Lamanon; the fossil in question was of a skull stored in a collection of Marquis de Drée. Previously, Lamanon thought that the skull belonged to an omnivorous amphibian, which Cuvier rejected. Cuvier proposed the idea that Palaeotherium, based on its nasal bones, had trunks more similar to tapirs than elephants. He said that the head of P. medium must have been on average about 30 cm (12 in) long, that its body size would have been somewhat smaller than those of tapirs but roughly matching up with regular pigs.

Later, he wrote about a species that he deemed to have similar dentition to P. medium to the extent that it belonged to Palaeotherium. Cuvier observed that the species had larger-sized dentition compared to the other species based on imprints that he was provided. Thus, he established the species Palaeotherium magnum. He also erected the genus Anoplotherium in recognition of its differing dentition from that of Palaeotherium. He also gave mentions to the postcranial fossils of the genus and listed a newly recognized species named Palaeotherium minus. In a later journal of the same year, Cuvier described a mostly complete skeleton from the French commune of Pantin that he determined to have belonged to P. minus.

=== Other Cuvierian species and reconstructions ===
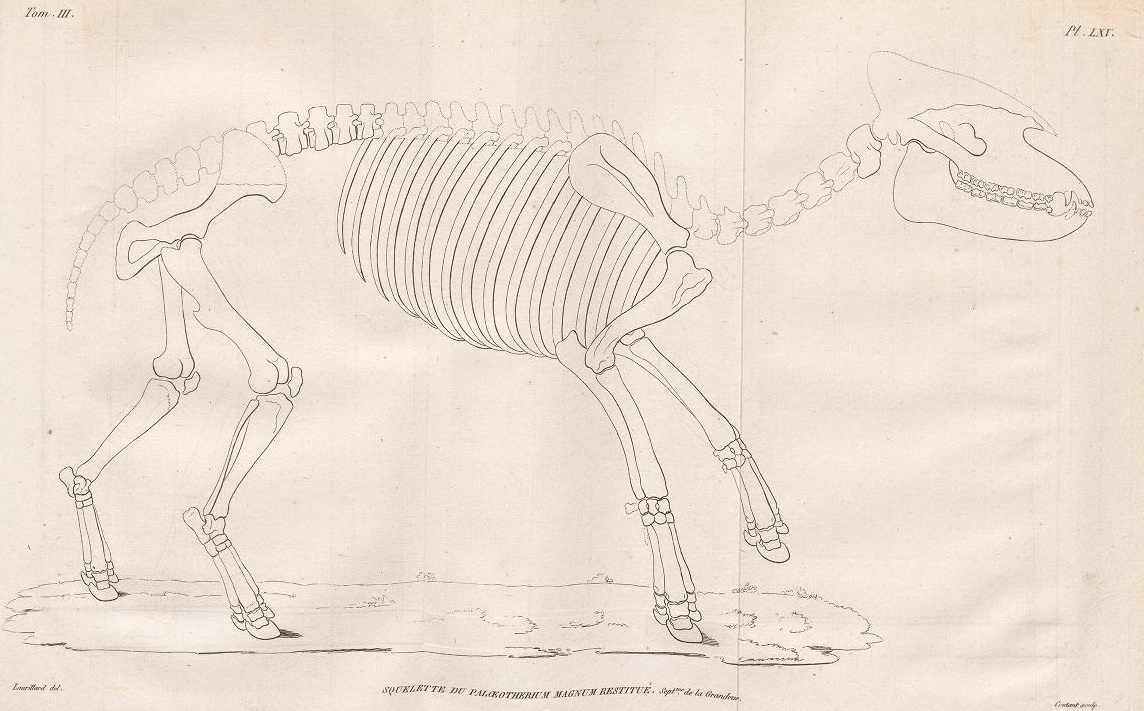
Reconstruction of the skeleton of P. magnum as depicted in 1822

In 1805, Cuvier described additional postcranial fossil bones of Palaeotherium. He noted that its forefeet consisted of three short toes and that no other animal had postcranial bones that closely resembled those of the extinct genus. Nonetheless, he also gave emphasis to some of the fossil foot bones resembling those of either tapirs or rhinoceroses. Based on the metacarpal bone shapes located on the front feet, he erected the species name P. crassum, mentioning that it was a distinct species from P. medium.

In 1812, he examined more metacarpal bone material that he classified as belonging to Palaeotherium. He stated that the newer material was nearly the size of those of P. crassum. Thus, he felt the need to establish another species P. curtum based on the fossils. He then made a review of the species he previously erected. According to Cuvier, P. magnum was the size of a horse. He then stated that both P. medium and P. crassum were both the size of a pig, the former having narrow and elongated feet and the having broader and shorter feet. P. curtum did not have any listed size analogue, but the naturalist said that it had the feet of a horse. Finally, he said that P. minus was the size of a sheep and had narrow feet. He also listed five new additional species from surrounding areas of France that he did not further elaborate on, such as the rhinoceros-sized P. giganteum, the ox-sized P. tapiroïdes, the pig-sized P. buxovillanum plus P. aurelianense, and the sheep-sized P. occitanicum.

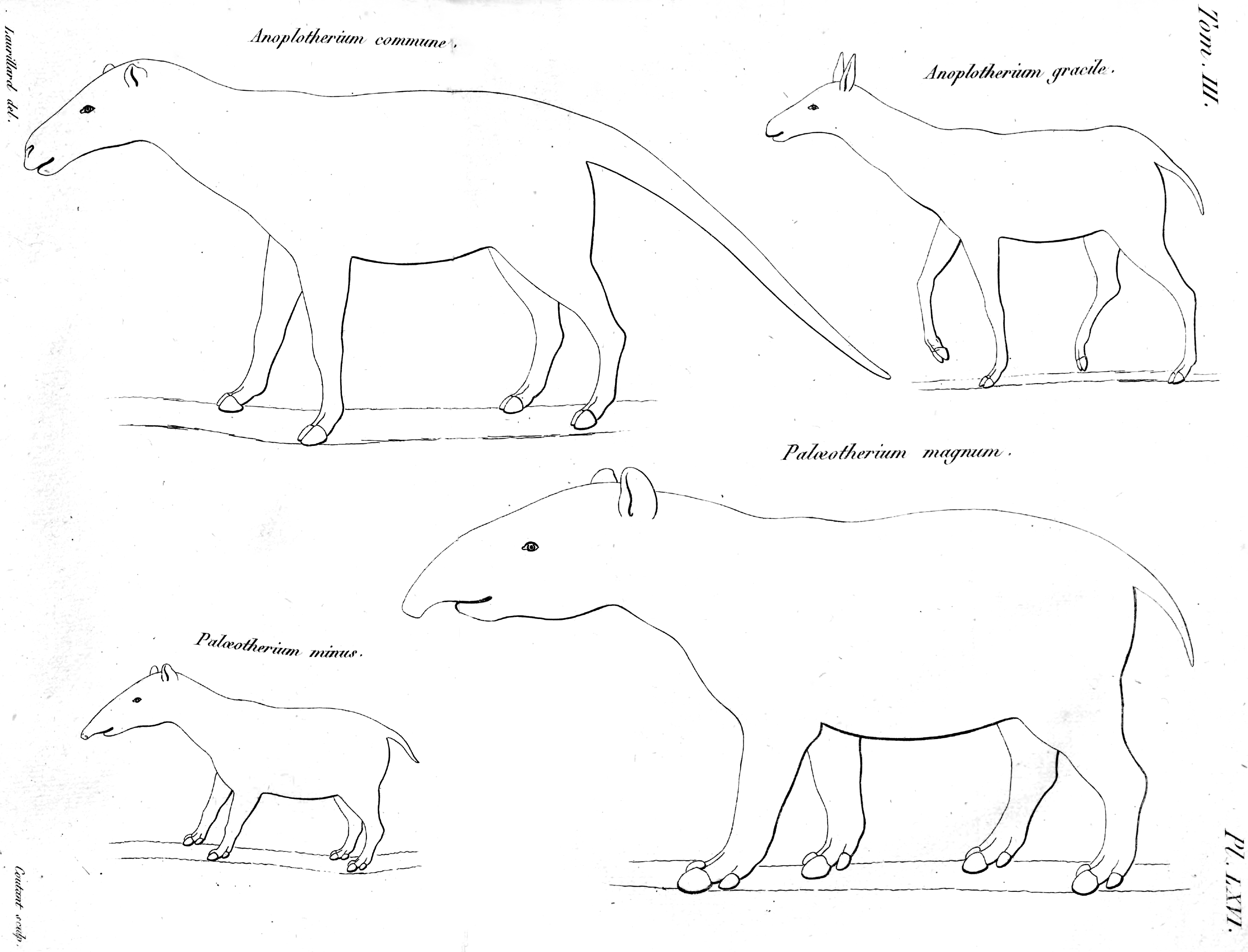
Drawings of species classified to Palaeotherium and Anoplotherium by Charles Léopold Laurillard under the work of Georges Cuvier

The naturalist also suggested palaeobiologies of the four species of Palaeotherium that he described from the gypsum quarries. He acknowledged that P. magnum had skull and limb bone material but lacked vertebra and rib fossils. Regardless, he was able to speculate based on available material that P. magnum would have resembled a tapir the size of a horse with bare amounts of hair. He also hypothesized that P. crassum would have resembled a tapir and been the size of one, which in theory would have caused people to confuse the two. P. medium, he suggested, would have also resembled a tapir but differed by higher legs and longer feet. He was able to construct a speculative skeletal reconstruction drawing of P. minus because of a previously found skeleton and hypothesized that it was smaller than a sheep and could have been cursorial with its slender legs and face. Finally, he theorized that P. curtum would have been the bulkiest species with lower legs compared to P. minus that were stocky like those of P. crassum. Cuvier also suggested that Palaeotherium as in the entire genus was tridactyl (or three-toed).

In 1822, Cuvier recognized three additional species of Palaeotherium based on postcranial materials. The first species he named was P. latum based on a medium-sized hind foot of different proportions from those of other species. The second species he named was P. indeterminatum based on an incomplete foot. The third and final species was P. minimum based on a single middle metatarsal bone. He also erected the genus Lophiodon, although he did not specify any species names within it. Cuvier also depicted a drawn reconstruction of the skeleton of P. magnum, outlining that it was the size of a Javan rhinoceros, was stocky in body build, and had a massive head. Palaeotherium was also depicted in 1822 drawings by the French palaeontologist Charles Léopold Laurillard under the direction of Cuvier. In 1824, he listed most species of Palaeotherium that he previously named and described, namely P. magnum, P. medium, P. crassum, P. latum, P. curtum, P. minus, and P. aureliense. He also recognized an additional species P. isselanum, but he did not describe its fossils.

=== Crystal Palace Dinosaurs ===
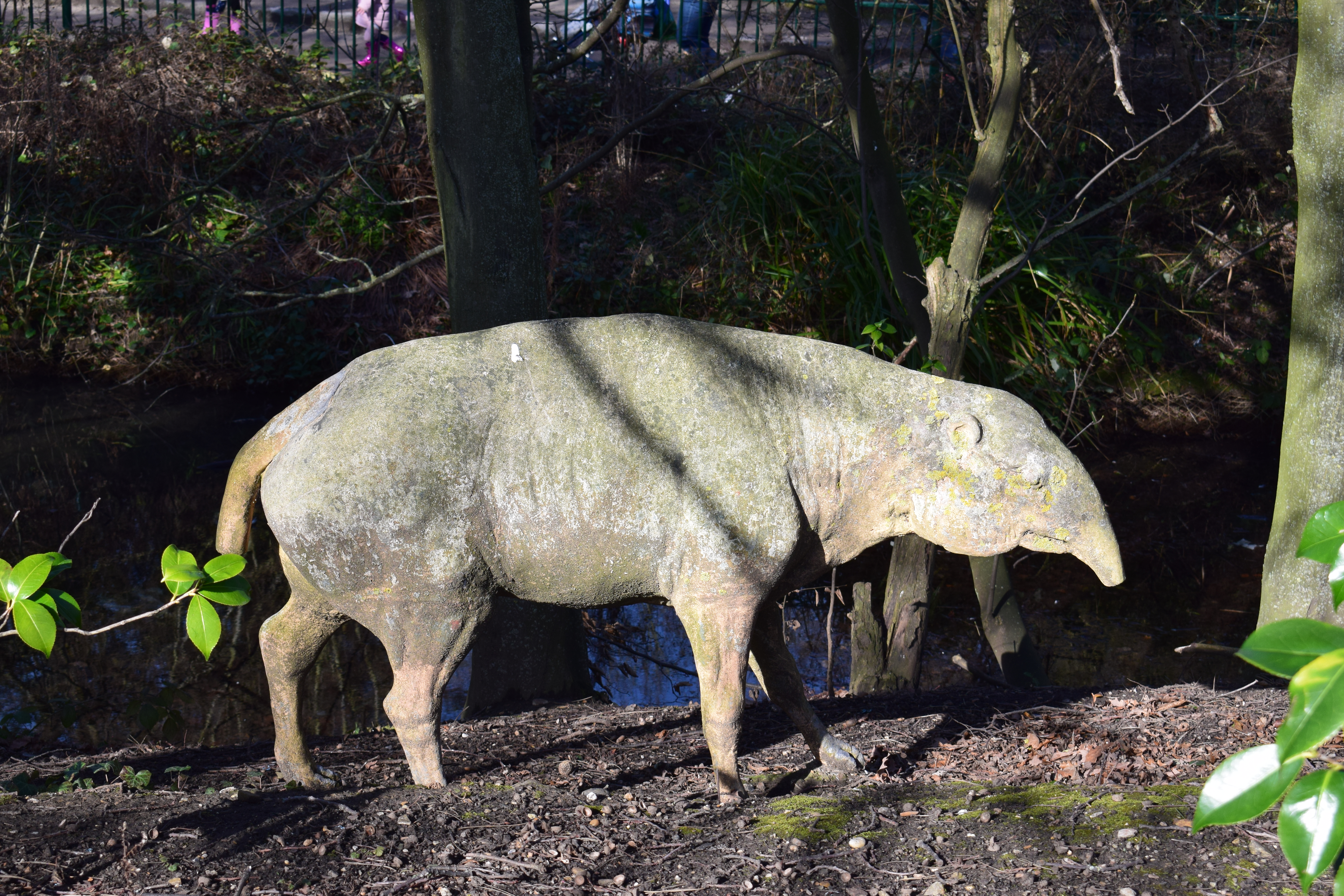
Sculpture of P. medium as part of the Crystal Palace Dinosaurs sculptures on the Tertiary Island of the Crystal Palace Park, United Kingdom

Since 1854, the family Palaeotheriidae is represented in the Crystal Palace Dinosaurs assemblage of the Crystal Palace Park by three individual sculptures, constructed by the English sculptor Benjamin Waterhouse Hawkins, that each represent different species, although the original large-sized P. magnum sculpture was lost at some point after 1958 and was replaced by a new replicated model in 2023. The other two palaeothere statues in the park represent the medium-sized P. medium and the small-sized "P. minus" (= Plagiolophus minor). Both the large P. magnum and P. medium were posed in standing positions whereas the smallest sitting statue was made to represent "P. minus". The models' resemblances to tapirs reflected early perceptions that the palaeothere species resembled them in body plan appearances. Despite this, the sculptures differ from living tapirs in several ways, such as shorter plus taller faces, higher eye positions, slender legs, longer tails, and the presence of three toes on the forelimbs unlike the four toes of the forelimbs of tapirs.

Of the three palaeothere sculptures, P. medium most closely resembled tapirs in appearance and measures 1.7 m (5 ft 7 in) long. Historically, the statue had lost its ears, trunk, and tail, all of which were then replaced by modern times. Its exterior was overall damaged by weathering, although the overall sculpture had otherwise remained largely intact. P. medium was depicted as having durable skin and a slender face with a trunk. The main inaccuracy of the sculpture comes from the presence of a trunk and the head not matching up with the longer and lower skull trait of P. medium. Its neutral standing position indicates that it was meant to represent a slow animal that lived in closed habitats.

As the original sculpture of P. magnum went unnoticed for some time, details about it are inferred through illustrations and photographs of it. A 1958 photograph of it suggests that it was twice the size of the Plagiolophus minor sculpture and least resembled tapirs in appearance. It was the largest and most robust-appearing palaeothere model with large and deep eyes, a proportionally large head, bulky legs, and a muscular-looking body plan. The trunk of the model appears to start from the upper section of the skull and descends down to the lower lip. The overall anatomy of the sculpture appears to have been based on elephants compared to the other two palaeothere statues.

== Post-Cuvierian research history ==
=== Early 19th century taxonomy ===
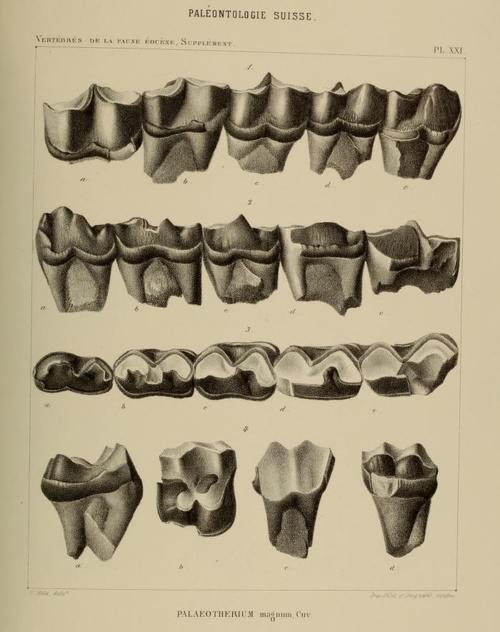
P. magnum dentition as figured in 1869

Since Cuvier's last namings of Palaeotherium species in 1822, other European taxonomists in the early 19th century proceeded to erect many other species names for the genus. In 1836, French geologist Alexandre Félix Gustave Achille Leymérie recalled the palaeontologist Étienne Geoffroy Saint-Hilaire communicating to his colleagues about a letter that palaeontologist Édouard Lartet wrote, in which he stated that he erected the species name P. equinum based on the fossils' similarities with the morphology of the horse. In 1839, German palaeontologist Christian Erich Hermann von Meyer wrote about fossils found near the Swiss town of Solothurn, documenting the name P. gracile without establishing anything else about its taxonomic status. He also listed another species P. schinzi. In 1843, French palaeontologist Auguste Bravard erected P. Brivatense based on partial postcranial fossils. Pierre Toussaint Marcel de Serres de Mesplès erected another species P. parvulum in 1844 without further elaboration. The French palaeontologist Auguste Aymard erected the species P. ovinum based on differences in dentition in 1846. In 1848, French naturalist Paul Gervais erected the "horse-sized" species P. aniciense based on fossils originally from the gypsum marls of Le Puy-en-Velay. In 1851, Lartet erected P. hippoïdes of the French locality of Sansan, describing its dentition to those of Palaeotherium species in Montmartre and its foot as having three digits, the middle one being the only one to touch the ground and be well-developed. He also listed the possibility of it being synonymous with P. aurelienense. In an 1839–1864 osteography, the French naturalist Henri Marie Ducrotay de Blainville listed Palaeotherium species previously recognized by other taxonomists and established two additional species P. velaunum and P. girondicum. He also listed "P." tapiroides, "P." buxovillanum, and "P." occitanicum as species belonging to Lophiodon.

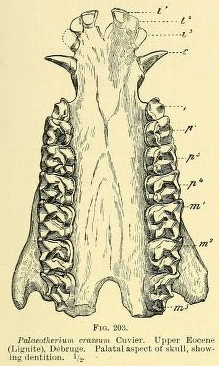
Lower jaw of P. crassum from the French locality of La Débruge with a mostly complete dental set

Several other equoid genus-level names were established in the early 19th century. In 1844, von Meyer established the genus Anchitherium based on the species "P." aurelianense as previously named by Cuvier. In 1847, another French naturalist Auguste Pomel wrote that Palaeotherium consists of three subgenera: Palaeotherium, Anchitherium, and the newly erected Plagiolophus, the last of which he classified P. minus to. In 1848, the British palaeontologist Richard Owen erected the genus Paloplotherium, created the species P. annectens for it, and referenced briefly the genus Anchitherium, although he did not mention the other taxon Plagiolophus. In 1849, Gervais recognized previously named palaeothere genera and additionally established the genus Propalaeotherium. Pomel also listed Plagiolophus as a distinct genus from Palaeotherium and also reclassified "P." ovinum into the former genus in 1853. In 1862, Swiss zoologist Ludwig Ruetimeyer defined Palaeotherium as distinct from other palaeothere genera and containing the species P. magnum, P. medium, P. latum, P. crassum, and P. curtum; Plagiolophus, according to the palaeontologist, includes P. minor while Propalaeotherium contains P. isselanum.

Several North American perissodactyl species originally classified to Palaeotherium were named in the 19th century. In 1850, American palaeontologist Joseph Leidy created two species based on fossils from North America: P? proutii (named after fellow palaeontologist Hiram A. Prout) and P. bairdi (named in honor of the museum curator Spencer Fullerton Baird). In 1852, Leidy in his memoir wrote that P? proutii could be assigned to its own genus Titanotherium. He also reassigned P. bairdii to Anchitherium. The accompanying atlas by David Dale Owen, Joseph Granville Norwood, and John Evans records another species name P. maximum. In 1854, Leidy created another species name P. giganteum based on molar fossils twice the size of that of P. magnum. "P." giganteum was eventually reassigned to Menodus, although both it and Titanotherium were soon rendered invalid. In 1875, American palaeontologist Othniel Charles Marsh reassigned "A." bairdii to its own genus Mesohippus.

=== Late 19th century taxonomy ===
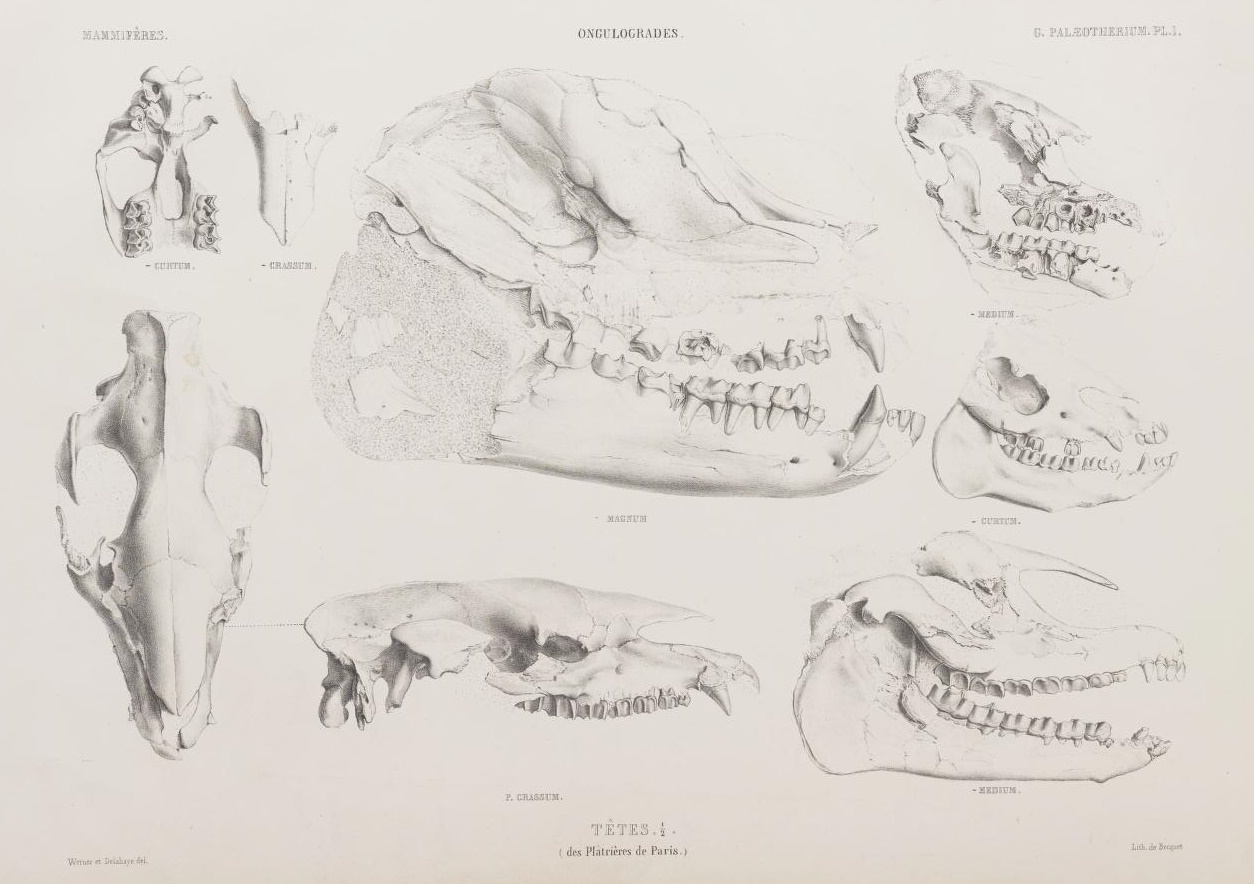
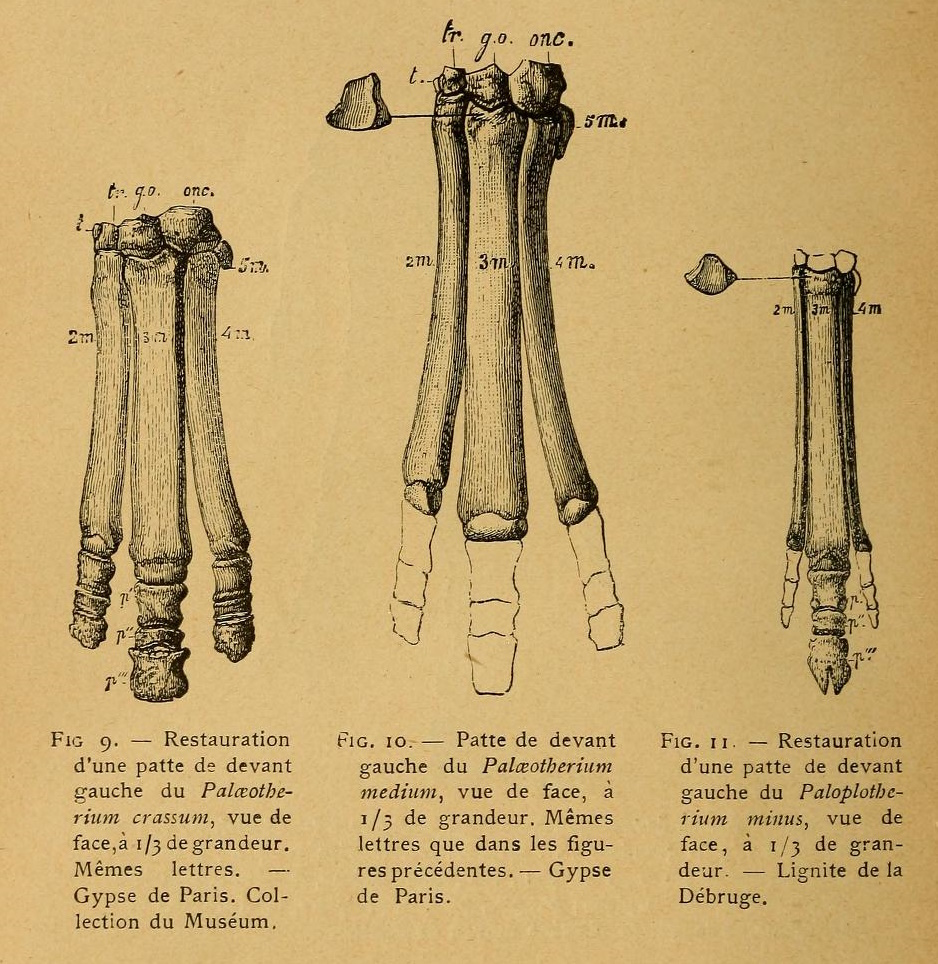
Illustrations of the fossil skulls (left) and limbs (right) of multiple palaeothere species including those of Palaeotherium

In 1853, Pomel erected the species P. duvali based on fossil limbs that he thought to have been less stocky compared to those of P. curtum. The same year, Swiss palaeontologist François Jules Pictet de la Rive stated that Aymard erected the species ame P. subgracile but also noted that the name was unpublished. He also stated that Aymard recognized two additional species P. primaevum and P. Gervaisii based on fossils from Le Puy-en-Velay. In 1859, Gervais listed the subspecies P. magnum parisiense and defined it only as being the same size as P. aniciense, alternatively P. magnum parisiense.

In 1858, French geographer Victor Martin de Moussy listed in his monography the species Anoplotherium americanum from the Paraná beds of Argentina, which he knew was mainly Miocene in age but thought that it also contained Eocene-aged fossils. For a long time, naturalists like Charles Lyell and Charles Darwin were unable to explain the apparent occurrences of Palaeotherium and Anoplotherium in a continent that was far from Europe. Eventually in 1886, Argentine naturalist Florentino Ameghino revised Palaeotherium paranense and Anoplotherium americanum to Scalabrinitherium and Proterotherium respectively, both of which compose part of the extinct endemic South American order Litopterna. The former species was eventually made synonymous with Scalabrinitherium bravardi.

In 1863, the French naturalist Jean-Baptiste Noulet created the species P. castrense based on an incomplete mandible from the commune of Viviers-lès-Montagnes, where it was later studied in Castres. In 1869, Pictet and Humbert erected the species Plagiolophus siderolithicus using fossil molars from a museum collection whose form is similar to that of P. minor but differs mainly by the dimensions. The same year, German palaeontologist Oscar Fraas erected P. suevicum based on teeth that he thought to have distinct enamel. Gervais in 1875 described fossil bones and teeth from the French commune of Dampleux, noting that the particular species was smaller than others classified to Palaeotherium and that the dental measurements were similar to those of Plagiolophus minor. He assigned the fossils to the species P. eocaenum. P. hippoïdes was synonymized with Anchitherium aureliense but was also later converted into a subspecies named A. aurelienense hippoides.

=== Palaeotherium magnum skeletons ===
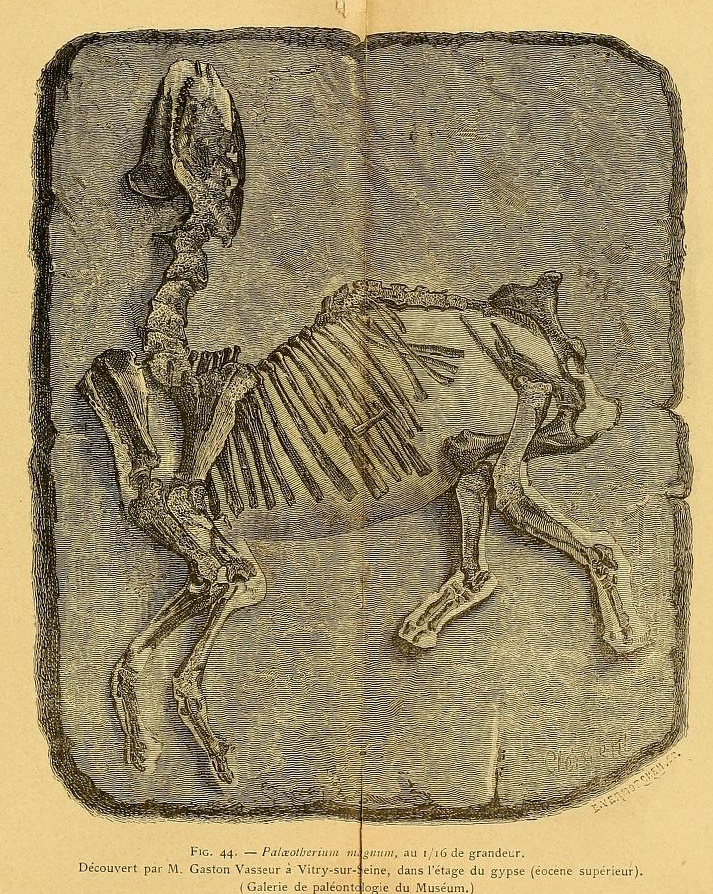
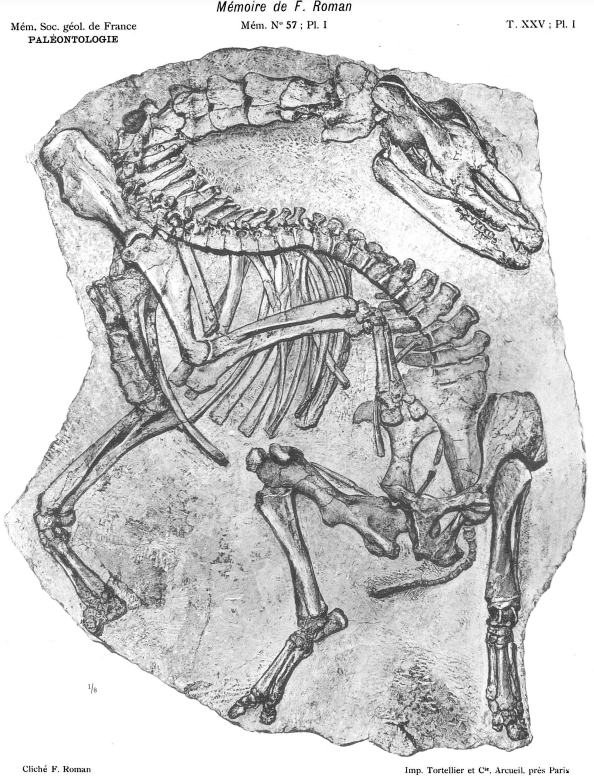
Illustrations of P. magnum skeletons from Vitry-sur-Seine (left) and Mormoiron (right)

For much of paleontological history, Palaeotherium was not known by any complete skeleton since its initial description by Cuvier. As part of his 1839–1864 osteography, Blainville reconstructed a complete skull of P. magnum; he argued that it lacked the short and straightened nasal bone that characterized tapirs and instead had such that was more equivalent to those of horses. He also wrote that P. magnum was probably slightly smaller than what Cuvier hypothesized about its horselike size. He also reconstructed skulls of other Palaeotherium species erected by Cuvier, determining that they had similar skull characteristics with each other and differed mainly by size.

In 1873, the French geologist Gaston Casimir Vasseur uncovered the first complete skeleton of P. magnum from a gypsum quarry in the commune of Vitry-sur-Seine. The quarry was owned by the civil engineer Fuchs, who donated the skeleton to the National Museum of Natural History, France. The skeleton was first described by Gervais in an academic journal the same year, who noted that it allows for more accurate confirmations of the species' anatomical traits. He pointed out that the skeleton had a skull measures 0.5 m (1 ft 8 in) long, a longer neck than previously expected, and a less stocky build compared to tapirs and rhinoceroses. The naturalist said that the extraction process was difficult but completed by multiple skillful workers. Since then, it has been displayed at the Gallery of Paleontology and Comparative Anatomy exhibit of the museum, where it had been noted as an important and famous component of the gallery to the modern day.

During the 20th century, a second complete skeleton of P. magnum was excavated from the plasters within the French commune of Mormoiron. It was sent to the geological department of the University of Lyon and described after preparation by the Austrian geologist Frédéric Roman in 1922. Roman depicted a drawing of a reconstruction of the skeleton of P. magnum based on the Mormoiron skeleton within his 1922 monography. According to Austrian palaeontologist Othenio Abel in 1923, it was the most complete skeleton of Palaeotherium to have been found and amongst the most complete of early Cenozoic mammal skeletons, missing only a few ribs and a left femur.

== 20th century taxonomic revisions ==
=== Early 20th century taxonomy ===
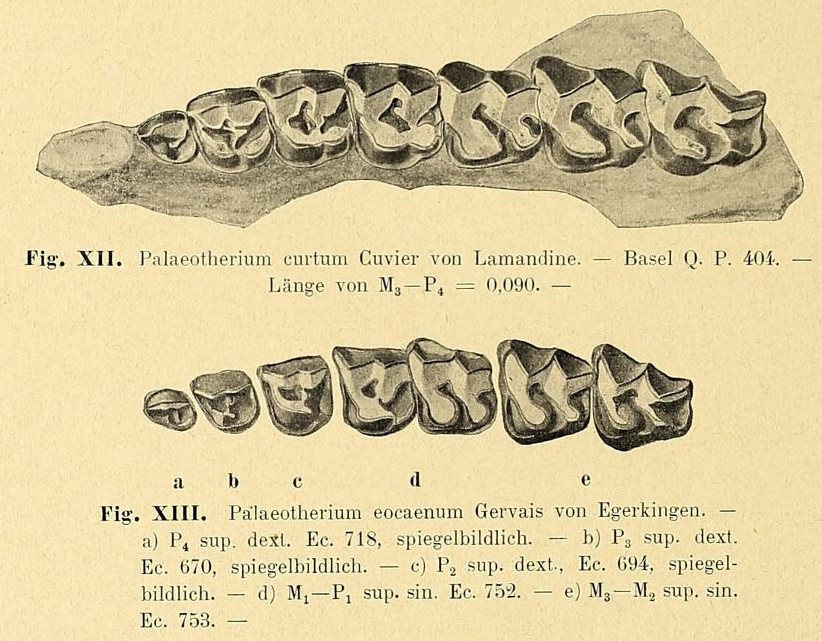
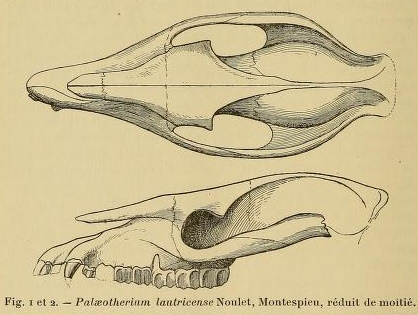
Illustrations of the dentition of P. curtum and P. eocaenum (left) and a reconstructed skull of P. lautricense (right)

The taxonomic complexity of Palaeotherium further developed from revisions by the Swiss palaeontologist Hans Georg Stehlin in 1904. The first species of Palaeotherium that he erected was P. lautricense based on an upper jaw from a collection at the Muséum de Toulouse that originated from sandstone deposits at Castres. He said that the dimensions of the canine's root do not much differ from that of P. curtum but that those of the molars display several prominent differences. He also wrote about a somewhat crushed but mostly complete skull of the same species that was collected by Noulet, drawing a reconstruction of it. Stehlin also said that a second skull of the same species from Castres is slightly less preserved and did not provide him with any additional information.

In his monography for palaeotheres, published also in 1904, Stehlin considered most species within Palaeotherium to be potentially valid, although he did not consider P. aniciense to be such. In his review, he noted that almost all taxonomists were conservative about either invalidating species erected by Cuvier or naming new ones based on material studied by him. Stehlin also revised P. girondicum as P. magnum var. girondicum, or P. magnum girondicum. He established the subspecies name P. curtum var. perrealense, or P. curtum perrealense, based on jaw fragments from La Débruge. The first new species that he named was P. Mühlbergi from dental material in the Swiss municipality of Obergösgen that Ruetimeyer examined back in 1862. The second, third, and fourth species that he named were P. Buseri, P. Heimi, and P. Möschi based on teeth from the same municipality, the former two also having been recognized from Mormont. He also stated that the recent excavations at Mormont from Natural History Museum of Basel had yielded fossils that he classified along with a mandible identified by Pictert in 1869 under the new species name P. Renevieri. Finally, he also determined that an additional species Palaeotherium Rütimeyeri, which he described as having primitive premolars, was present in the municipality of Egerkingen. Of note is that Stehlin previously established the species names Palaeotherium Depereti and Paloplotherium Rütimeyeri in 1902 but that the latter is dubious due to the lack of established fossil descriptions and is therefore synonymous with the 1904 species name.

In 1910, the French palaeontologist Charles Depéret erected the lophiodont genus Lophiaspis, reclassifying "Lophiodon" occitanicus into the newer taxon. Later in 1917, he recognized two additional species of Palaeotherium called P. Euzetense and P. Stehlini. German palaeontologist Wilhelm Otto Dietrich named the German species P. Kleini in 1922, basing it off of fossils from the locality of Mähringen and mentioning that it would have been the size of P. curtum and P. Heimi.

=== Later 20th century revisions ===
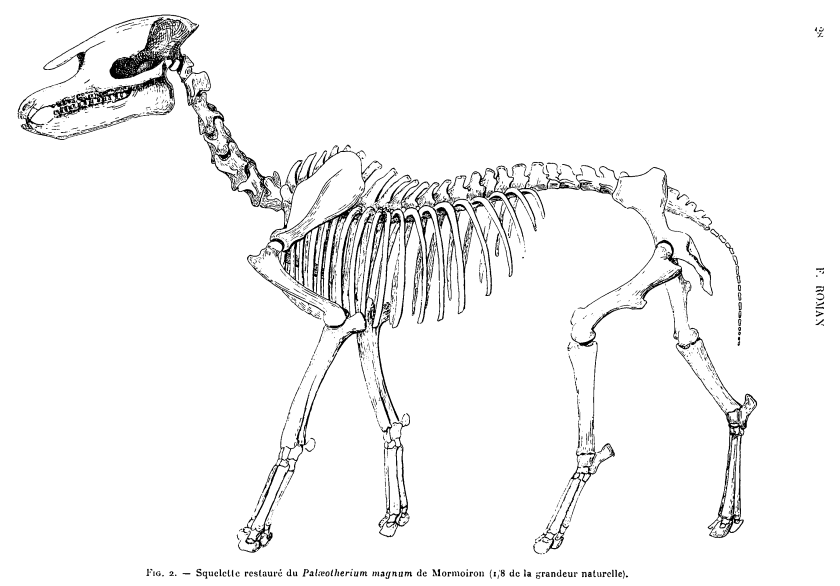
Drawing of a reconstructed skeleton of P. magnum based on that from the French commune of Mormoiron, 1922

In 1968, upcoming German palaeontologist Jens Lorenz Franzen, then a graduate student, made major revisions of Palaeotherium within his dissertation. In his species synonymization process, he listed P. aniciense, P. subgracile, and P. magnum parisiense as synonyms of P. magnum; P. brivatense and P. moeschi as synonyms of P. medium; P. indeterminatum as a synonym of P. crassum, P. latum and P. buseri as synonymous with P. curtum; P. kleini as a synonym of P. duvali; and P. velaunum as synonymous with P. muehlbergi. He additionally listed P. giganteum, P. gracile, P. parvulum, P. commune, P. primaevum, and P. gervaisii as dubious species names, although he also considered the first species to have possibly belonged to the Rhinocerotidae instead. Stehlin also reclassified P. "curtum" perrealense into P. medium.

Furthermore, Franzen converted some species into subspecies, namely P. magnum girondicum, P. magnum stehlini, P. medium suevicum, and P. medium euzetense. In addition, he named the following subspecies that he named in his thesis: P. castrense robiacense, P. crassum robustum, P. curtum villerealense, P. curtum frohnstettense, P. muehlbergi praecursum, and P. duvali priscum. Not all species within Palaeotherium have any recognized subspecies in them. He also erected P. pomeli using fossils from a locality in Castres and reclassified "Plagiolophus" siderolithicum into Palaeotherium.

In 1975, Spanish palaeontologist María Lourdes Casanovas-Cladellas erected the species P. crusafonti from a left maxilla with dentition from the Spanish site of Roc de Santa. In her 1975 thesis, Casanovas-Cladellas explained that the etymology of the species name was in honor of Spanish palaeontologist Miquel Crusafont i Pairó. In 1980, both she and José-Vicente Santafé-Llopis established the second Iberian species P. franzeni, taking into account morphological differences of the dental fossils from the Spanish municipality of Sossís.

Palaeontologist Pierre Dedieu established the lophiodont genus Paralophiodon in 1977, reassigning "L." buxowillanum into the newer taxon.

In 1985, the French palaeontologist Jean-Albert Remy named a subspecies P. muehlbergi thaleri in honor of fellow palaeontologist Louis Thaler, having documented that its fossils were from the commune of Saint-Étienne-de-l'Olm and that both the holotype and paratype each consist of a skull with a mandible.

In 1991, Casanovas-Cladellas and Santafé-Llopis erected P. llamaquiquense from partial jaw material from the Spanish locality of Llamaquique in the city of Oviedo, where the name derived from.

The next year in 1992, Remy proposed the creation of two subgenera of Palaeotherium based on cranial characteristics. The first subgenus he listed was Palaeotherium, which includes the type species P. magnum along with P. medium, P. crassum, P. curtum, P. castrense, P. siderolithicum, and P. muehlbergi. The second subgenus name that he proposed was Franzenitherium, which includes the type species P. lautricense plus P. duvali and was named in honor of Franzen's review of Palaeotherium.

The Spanish palaeontologist Miguel Ángel Cuesta Ruiz-Colmenares established the species P. giganteum using dentition from the Mazaterón site in the Duero Basin in 1993, considering it to be the largest species of Palaeotherium known.

In 1998, Casanovas-Cladellas et al. formally recognized P. crassum sossissense from a fragmented right maxilla with dentition from Sossís in Spain. They also invalidated the previously named P. franzeni due to reassigning the material to P. magnum stehlini.
