= Monieux =

- Commune
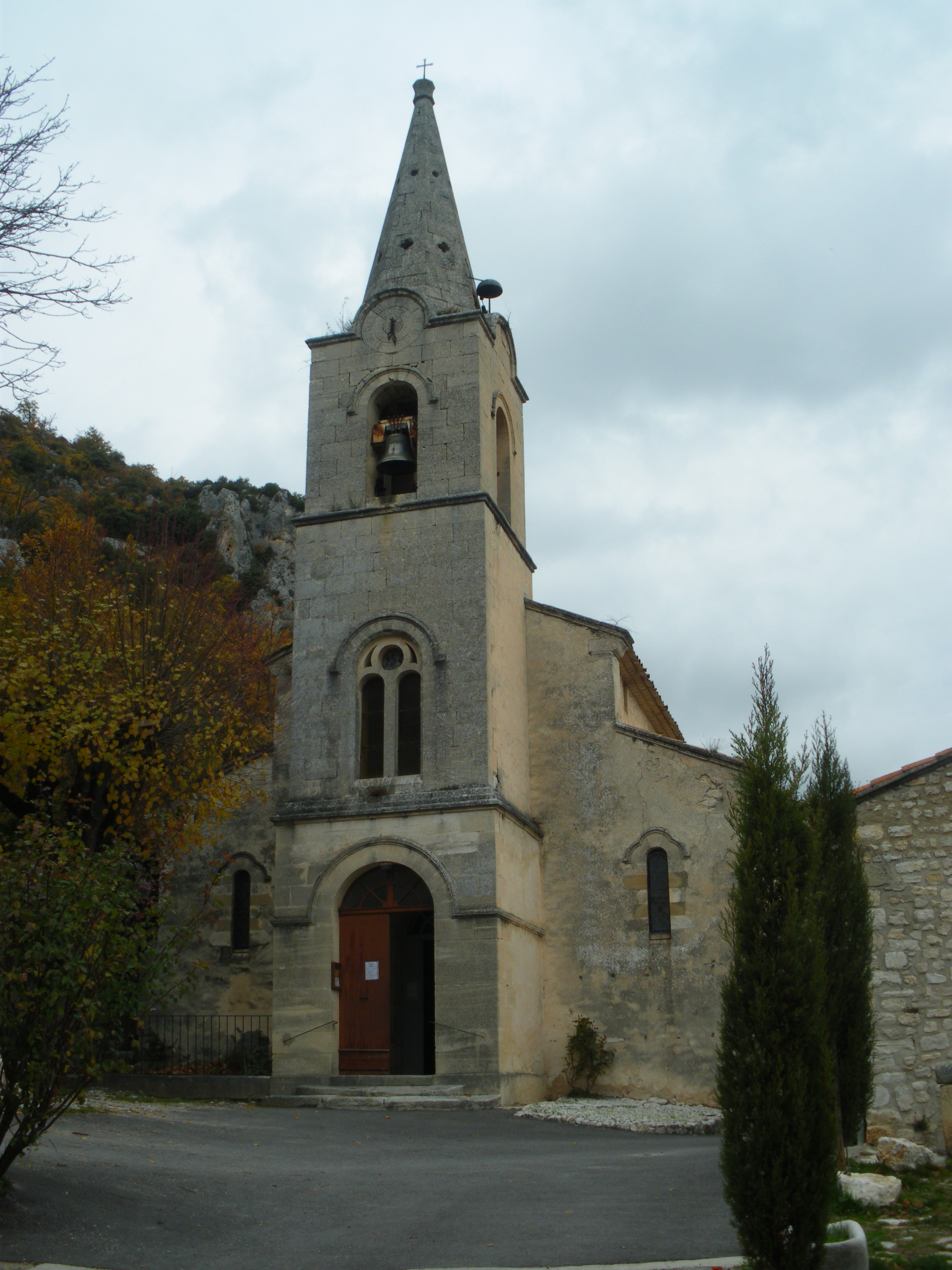
- Church of Monieux

- Coat of arms
- Location of Monieux
- Location within France Location within Provence-Alpes-Côte d'Azur
- Coordinates: 44°04′05″N 5°21′35″E
- Country: France
- Region: Provence-Alpes-Côte d'Azur
- Department: Vaucluse
- Arrondissement: Carpentras
- Canton: Pernes-les-Fontaines

Government
  - Mayor (2020–2026): Alain Gabert
- Area^{1}: 47.12 km^{2} (18.19 sq mi)
- Elevation: 700 m (2,300 ft)
- Highest elevation: 1,022 m (3,353 ft)
- Lowest elevation: 439 m (1,440 ft)
- Population (2023): 263
  - Density: 5.58/km^{2} (14.5/sq mi)
- Time zone: UTC+01:00 (CET)
  - Summer (DST): UTC+02:00 (CEST)
- INSEE/Postal code: 84079 /84390
- ^{1} French Land Register data, which excludes lakes, ponds, glaciers > 1 km^{2} (0.386 sq mi or 247 acres) and river estuaries.

Monieux (French pronunciation: [mɔnjø]; Occitan: Monius) is a commune in the Vaucluse department in the Provence-Alpes-Côte d'Azur region in southeastern France.

== Geography ==
The commune of Monieux is located on the plateau of the Mounts of Vaucluse, near to the commune of Sault. It shelters on its territory part of the classified as sites “Reserve of Biosphere” of the Ventoux Mount.

== Hydrology ==
La Nesque flows through Monieux.

== Climate ==
The commune is located in the zone of influence of the Mediterranean climate. The summers are hot and dry, related to the increase in altitude of the subtropical anticyclones, intersected with stormy episodes sometimes violent one. The winters are soft. Precipitations are not very frequent and rare snow. It there 275 days of sun per year.

== Demography ==
Historical population
Year	Pop.	±% p.a.
1968	151	—
1975	122	−3.00%
1982	171	+4.94%
1990	158	−0.98%
1999	250	+5.23%
2007	334	+3.69%
2012	350	+0.94%
2017	317	−1.96%
2023	263	−3.06%
Source: INSEE

== History ==
The town of Monieux is the possible site of a medieval pogrom that occurred at the end of the 11th century, as determined by Historian Norman Golb, but Dr. Ben Outhwaite, Head of the Geniza Research Unit of Cambridge University, summarized the findings of Hebrew University researchers Edna Engel and Yoseph Yahalom that strongly suggest the correct location of this attack is not Monieux at all, rather Muño, in northern Spain. The sole evidence of this attack by Crusaders on the community is indicated through the discovery of a manuscript in the Cairo Geniza. When Jacob Mann first translated the beginning portion of the document in 1931, the location of the attack described was misinterpreted as taking place in the province of Anjou. In 1969, however, when Norman Golb retranslated the document, he discovered that the referral to the pogrom’s location as a town did not coincide correctly with Mann’s assessment of the locale as Anjou, which was recognized as a province during the time period. Through further inspection, he found that an improper reading of the Hebrew script had led Mann further astray in his translation; Golb, therefore, ultimately published his translation of the document in its entirety, highlighting that Monieux and not Anjou was the site of the attack.

The document, a vellum-inscribed letter written in Hebrew by Joshua B. Obadiah of Monieux, France, exposes the severe maltreatment of the Jewish people when their small community in southeastern France was attacked during the First Crusade of 1096–1099 CE. The manuscript itself serves a unique purpose in that it was not written in the context of memoirs such as those of Usama Ibn Munqidh and Fulcher of Chartres, but was constructed as a letter of recommendation for a woman of note who was living in the community of Monieux during the time of the pogrom. Obadiah’s writings feature an account of the profound misfortune of a proselytess, a woman who, having left her homeland after converting to Judaism, first took refuge in Narbonnne, France. There, she married R. David, a member of a well-respected family in the region. When she began to fear that her relatives would find her via the established Christian authority in Narbonne, she left the city and settled in the remote village of Monieux, France, roughly six years prior to the arrival of the Crusaders.

Obadiah writes of the harrowing fate of the proselytess during the severe attack on the Jews by the French Crusaders, in which her husband was murdered in the synagogue and her two young children, a boy and a girl, were taken captive—likely to be converted to Christianity by the enemy. Left to care for her infant son, Obadiah describes the woman as penurious and “in thirst and nakedness, lacking all provisions, and with no fund to pay for her (daily needs) and (those of) her son.” With only a small number of Jews remaining after the pogrom, “a few from many,” the residents of Monieux no longer had the means to care for the widowed proselytess. This letter, therefore, written by a literate community member in Monieux, provides a full breadth of the woman’s hardships in hopes that she could present it to members of another Jewish community and be taken in there. The discovery of the letter in Egypt suggests that the woman may have travelled far eastward from Monieux after the pogrom, ultimately settling in the flourishing Jewish community of Cairo, where she could be cared for effectively.

== See also ==
- Communes of the Vaucluse department
