= Thézan Castle =

General information
- Location: 58 Rue du Château, F-84210 SAINT-DIDIER
- Coordinates: 44°00′16″N 5°06′41″E

Website
- www.chateaudethezan.com

The Château de Thézan is the castle of the village of Saint-Didier, in the French department of Vaucluse.

== Location ==
The Thézan castle is located near the church of the village.

== History ==
A mention of a residence dates back to 1159, under the name "Villa Desiderii". This ancient medieval fortress became, in the 16th century, the residence of the Marquis of Thézan-Venasque, who developed the site in a Renaissance style. It was built on the foundations of an ancient Gallo-Roman villa. Louis de Thézan and his son Paul-Aldonce-François were involved in the modernization works.

At the beginning of the 19th century, upon the death of the last Marquise of Thézan, the property changed hands several times: in 1809, her niece, Olympe de la Baume-Suze inherited the estate, and sold it back to Louis, Marquis Pelletier de Gigondas de La Garde in 1814 for the sum of 96,000 Francs. His son, in the middle of the 19th century, created the Orangerie, after transforming the French-style garden into an English-style garden. Ruined, he was forced to sell the castle in 1862.

The building enters a new era, that of thermalism, under the impetus of a doctor from Carpentras, Adolphe Masson. Initially frequented by a wealthy clientele, over the course of a few decades, the care facility gradually became, in the 20th century, a clinic for rest and treatment of nervous diseases, which closed its doors in 1980. Abandoned for several years, it was purchased in April 2019 by Pierre de Beytia and Emmanuel Renoux. Since 2022, the castle and its park have been open to visitors from April to October.
