= Bédoin =

- Commune
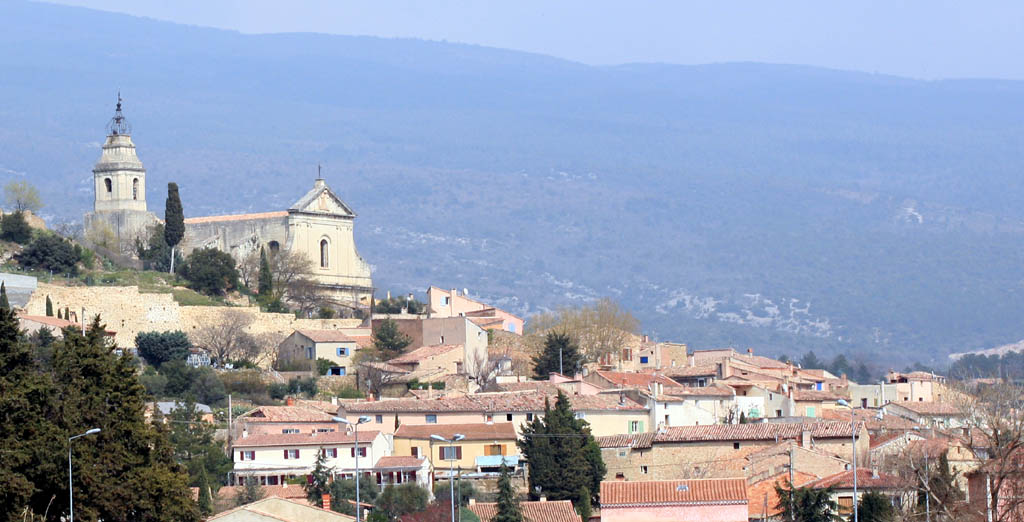
- The village of Bédoin

- Coat of arms
- Location of Bédoin
- Location within France Location within Provence-Alpes-Côte d'Azur
- Coordinates: 44°07′26″N 5°10′50″E
- Country: France
- Region: Provence-Alpes-Côte d'Azur
- Department: Vaucluse
- Arrondissement: Carpentras
- Canton: Pernes-les-Fontaines
- Intercommunality: CA Ventoux-Comtat Venaissin

Government
  - Mayor (2020–2026): Alain Constant
- Area^{1}: 91.03 km^{2} (35.15 sq mi)
- Elevation: 300 m (980 ft)
- Highest elevation: 1,883 m (6,178 ft)
- Lowest elevation: 240 m (790 ft)
- Population (2023): 3,106
  - Density: 34.12/km^{2} (88.37/sq mi)
- Time zone: UTC+01:00 (CET)
  - Summer (DST): UTC+02:00 (CEST)
- INSEE/Postal code: 84017 /84410
- ^{1} French Land Register data, which excludes lakes, ponds, glaciers > 1 km^{2} (0.386 sq mi or 247 acres) and river estuaries.

Bédoin (French pronunciation: [bedwɛ̃]; Occitan: Bedoin) is a commune in the Vaucluse department in the Provence-Alpes-Côte d'Azur region in southeastern France.

== Geography ==
Located at the base of Mont Ventoux, it is the starting point of one of the three routes to the summit of the mountain (the other routes start in Malaucène and Sault). The Tour de France frequently uses this approach to Mont Ventoux hence the strong presence of cycling in the town.

== Population ==
Historical population
Year	Pop.	±% p.a.
1968	1,611	—
1975	1,635	+0.21%
1982	1,818	+1.53%
1990	2,215	+2.50%
1999	2,609	+1.84%
2007	3,019	+1.84%
2012	3,147	+0.83%
2017	3,099	−0.31%
2023	3,106	+0.04%
Source: INSEE

== Sights ==
Bédoin contains a large Spanish-style church, constructed by Jesuits in 1702.

== History ==
In 1794, the village of Bédoin was destroyed by the Revolutionaries and 66 people were executed.

== See also ==
- Communes of the Vaucluse department
