= Villes-sur-Auzon =

- Commune
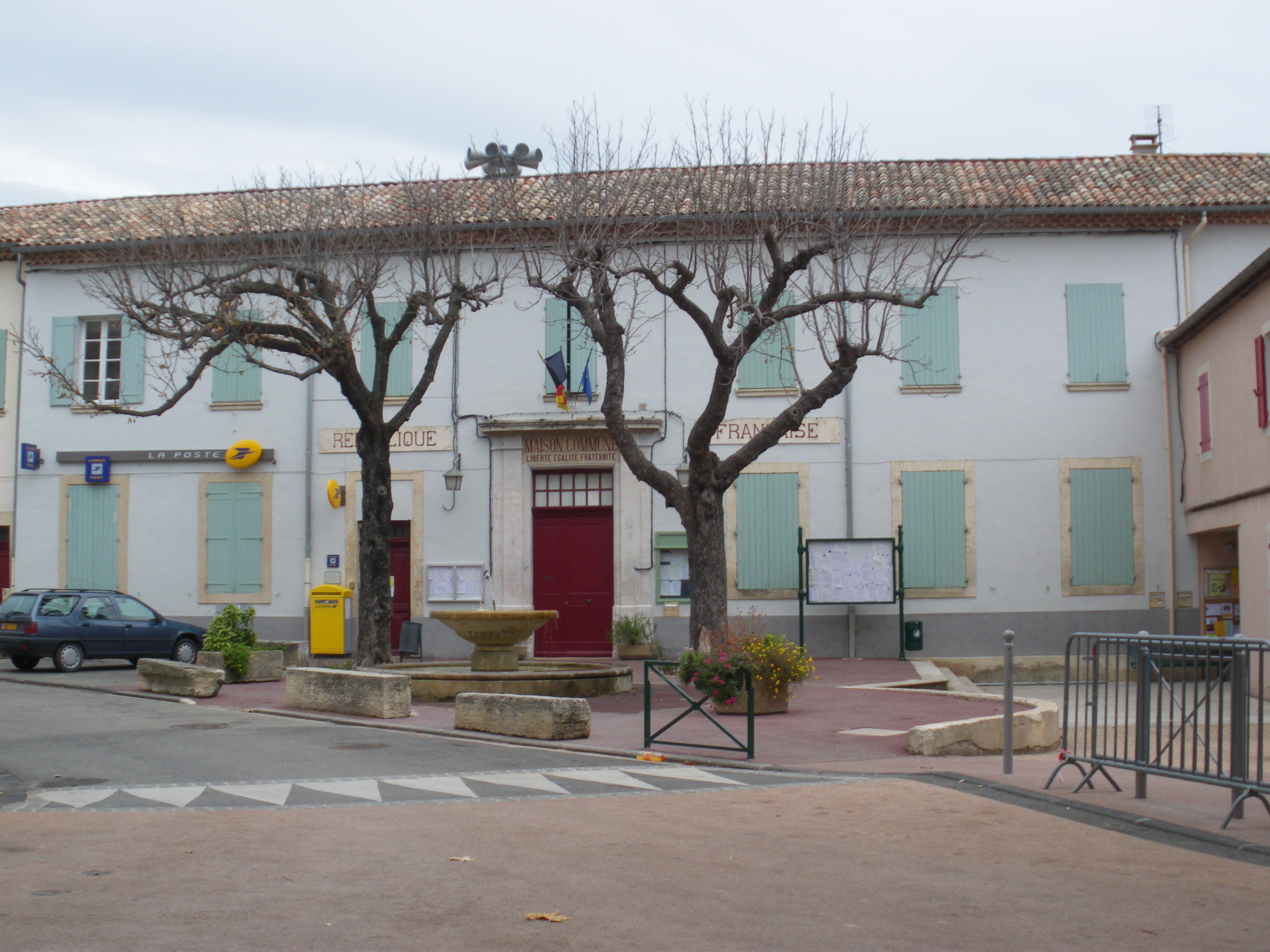
- Town hall

- Coat of arms
- Location of Villes-sur-Auzon
- Location within France Location within Provence-Alpes-Côte d'Azur
- Coordinates: 44°03′32″N 5°14′03″E
- Country: France
- Region: Provence-Alpes-Côte d'Azur
- Department: Vaucluse
- Arrondissement: Carpentras
- Canton: Pernes-les-Fontaines

Government
  - Mayor (2020–2026): Frédéric Rouet
- Area^{1}: 27.08 km^{2} (10.46 sq mi)
- Elevation: 294 m (965 ft)
- Highest elevation: 856 m (2,808 ft)
- Lowest elevation: 240 m (790 ft)
- Population (2023): 1,306
  - Density: 48.23/km^{2} (124.9/sq mi)
- Time zone: UTC+01:00 (CET)
  - Summer (DST): UTC+02:00 (CEST)
- INSEE/Postal code: 84148 /84570
- ^{1} French Land Register data, which excludes lakes, ponds, glaciers > 1 km^{2} (0.386 sq mi or 247 acres) and river estuaries.

Villes-sur-Auzon (French pronunciation: [vil syʁ ozɔ̃]; Occitan: Vielas d'Auson) is a commune in the Vaucluse department in the Provence-Alpes-Côte d'Azur region in southeastern France.

== See also ==
- Communes of the Vaucluse department
