= Flassan =

- Commune
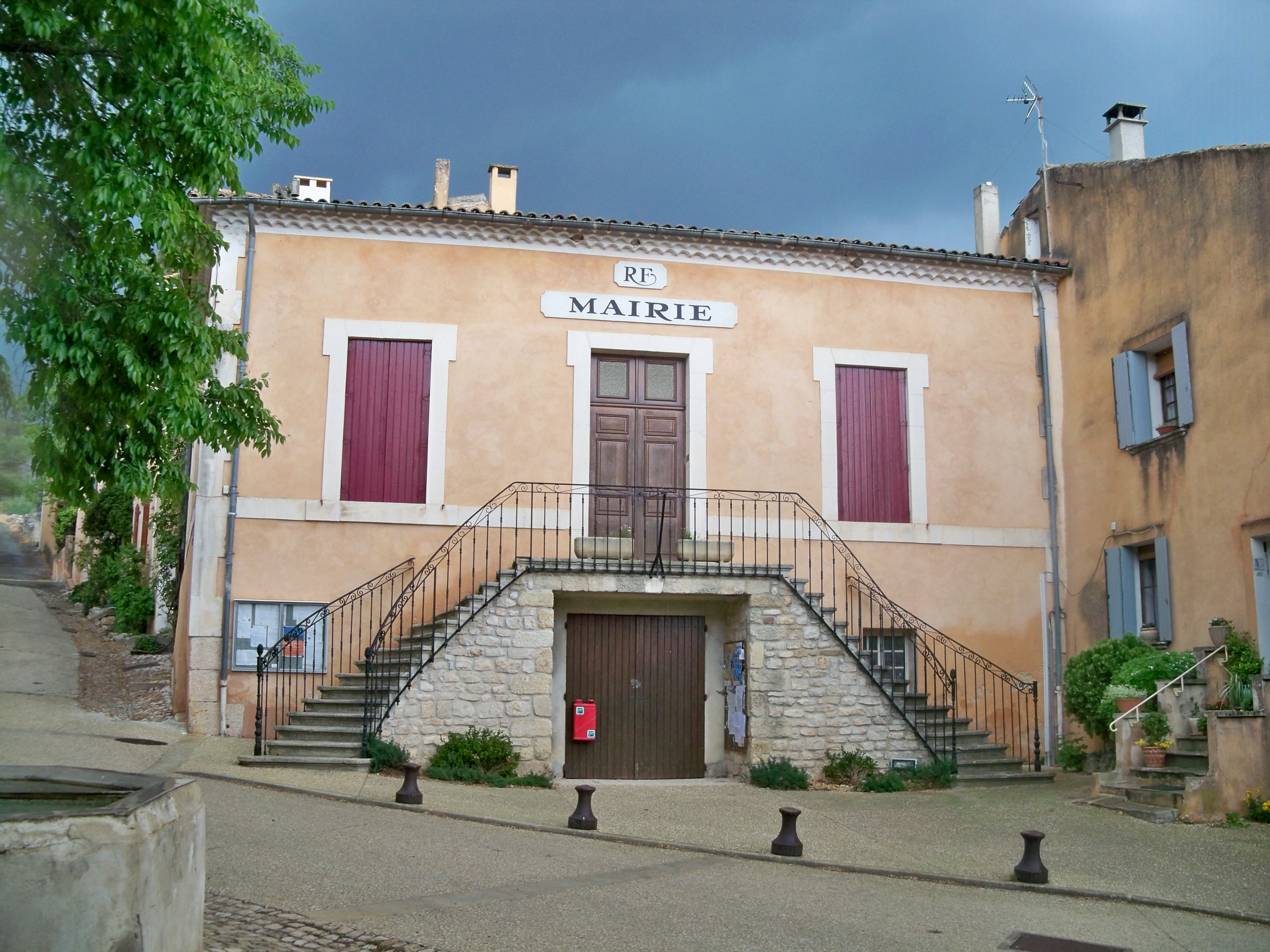
- Flassan's town hall

- Coat of arms
- Location of Flassan
- Location within France Location within Provence-Alpes-Côte d'Azur
- Coordinates: 44°05′59″N 5°14′33″E
- Country: France
- Region: Provence-Alpes-Côte d'Azur
- Department: Vaucluse
- Arrondissement: Carpentras
- Canton: Pernes-les-Fontaines
- Intercommunality: CA Ventoux-Comtat Venaissin

Government
  - Mayor (2020–2026): Michel Jouve
- Area^{1}: 20.6 km^{2} (8.0 sq mi)
- Elevation: 437 m (1,434 ft)
- Highest elevation: 1,058 m (3,471 ft)
- Lowest elevation: 337 m (1,106 ft)
- Population (2023): 453
  - Density: 22.0/km^{2} (57.0/sq mi)
- Time zone: UTC+01:00 (CET)
  - Summer (DST): UTC+02:00 (CEST)
- INSEE/Postal code: 84046 /84410
- ^{1} French Land Register data, which excludes lakes, ponds, glaciers > 1 km^{2} (0.386 sq mi or 247 acres) and river estuaries.

Flassan (French pronunciation: [flasɑ̃]; Occitan: Flaçan) is a commune in the Vaucluse department in the Provence-Alpes-Côte d'Azur region in southeastern France.

== Geography ==
Flassan is located at the foot of Mont Ventoux.

== Demography ==
Historical population
Year	Pop.	±% p.a.
1968	249	—
1975	251	+0.11%
1982	295	+2.33%
1990	332	+1.49%
1999	341	+0.30%
2007	410	+2.33%
2012	411	+0.05%
2017	465	+2.50%
2023	453	−0.43%
Source: INSEE

== See also ==
- Communes of the Vaucluse department
