= Saint-Trinit =

- Commune
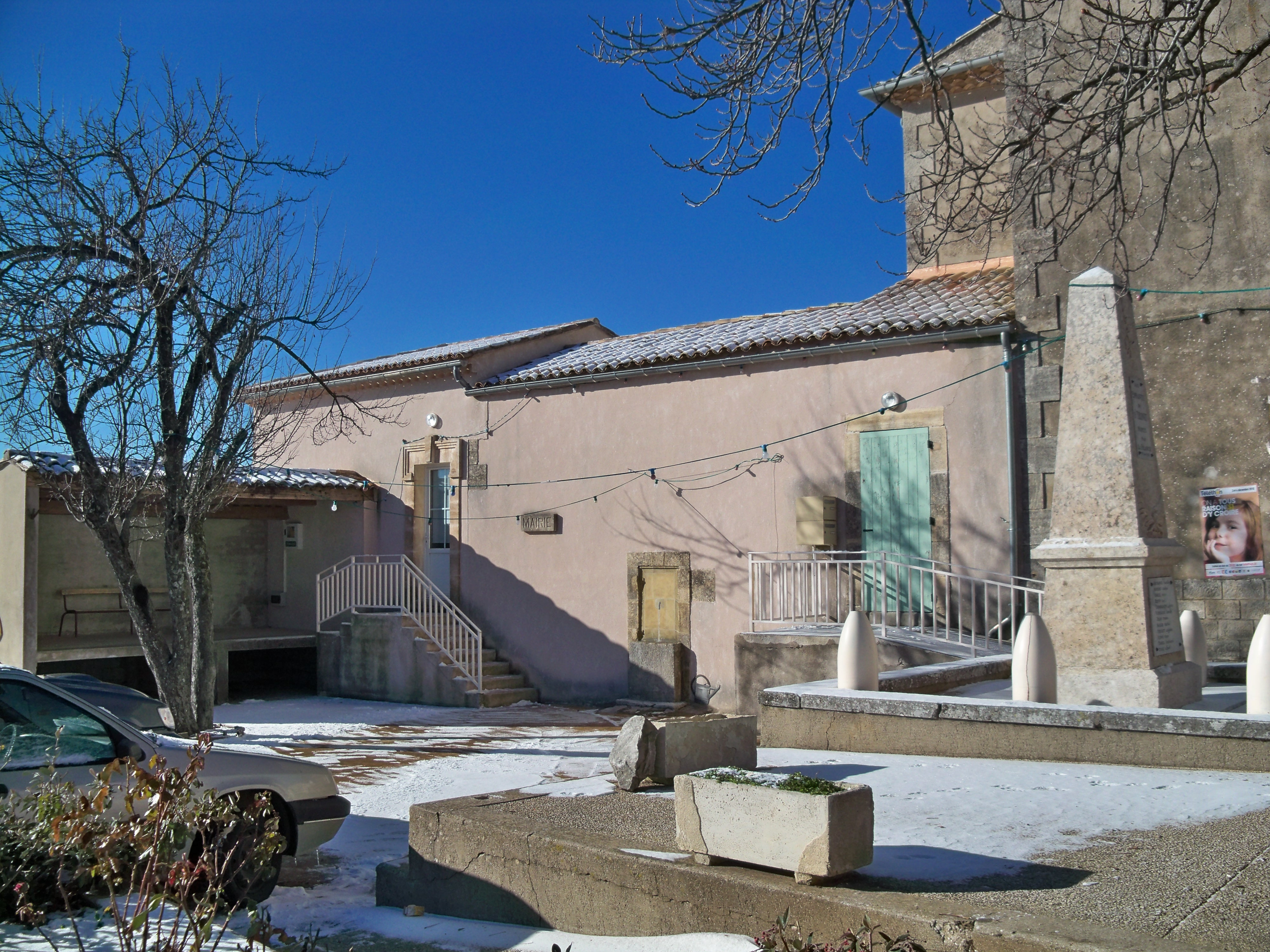
- Town hall

- Coat of arms
- Location of Saint-Trinit
- Location within France Location within Provence-Alpes-Côte d'Azur
- Coordinates: 44°06′12″N 5°27′59″E
- Country: France
- Region: Provence-Alpes-Côte d'Azur
- Department: Vaucluse
- Arrondissement: Carpentras
- Canton: Pernes-les-Fontaines
- Intercommunality: Ventoux Sud

Government
  - Mayor (2020–2026): Michel Archange
- Area^{1}: 16.66 km^{2} (6.43 sq mi)
- Elevation: 836 m (2,743 ft)
- Highest elevation: 914 m (2,999 ft)
- Lowest elevation: 780 m (2,560 ft)
- Population (2023): 118
  - Density: 7.08/km^{2} (18.3/sq mi)
- Time zone: UTC+01:00 (CET)
  - Summer (DST): UTC+02:00 (CEST)
- INSEE/Postal code: 84120 /84390
- ^{1} French Land Register data, which excludes lakes, ponds, glaciers > 1 km^{2} (0.386 sq mi or 247 acres) and river estuaries.

Saint-Trinit (French pronunciation: [sɛ̃ tʁini]; Provençal: Sant Ternit) is a commune in the Vaucluse department in the Provence-Alpes-Côte d'Azur region in southeastern France.

== See also ==
- Communes of the Vaucluse department
