= Saint-Didier, Vaucluse =

Saint-Didier
- Commune
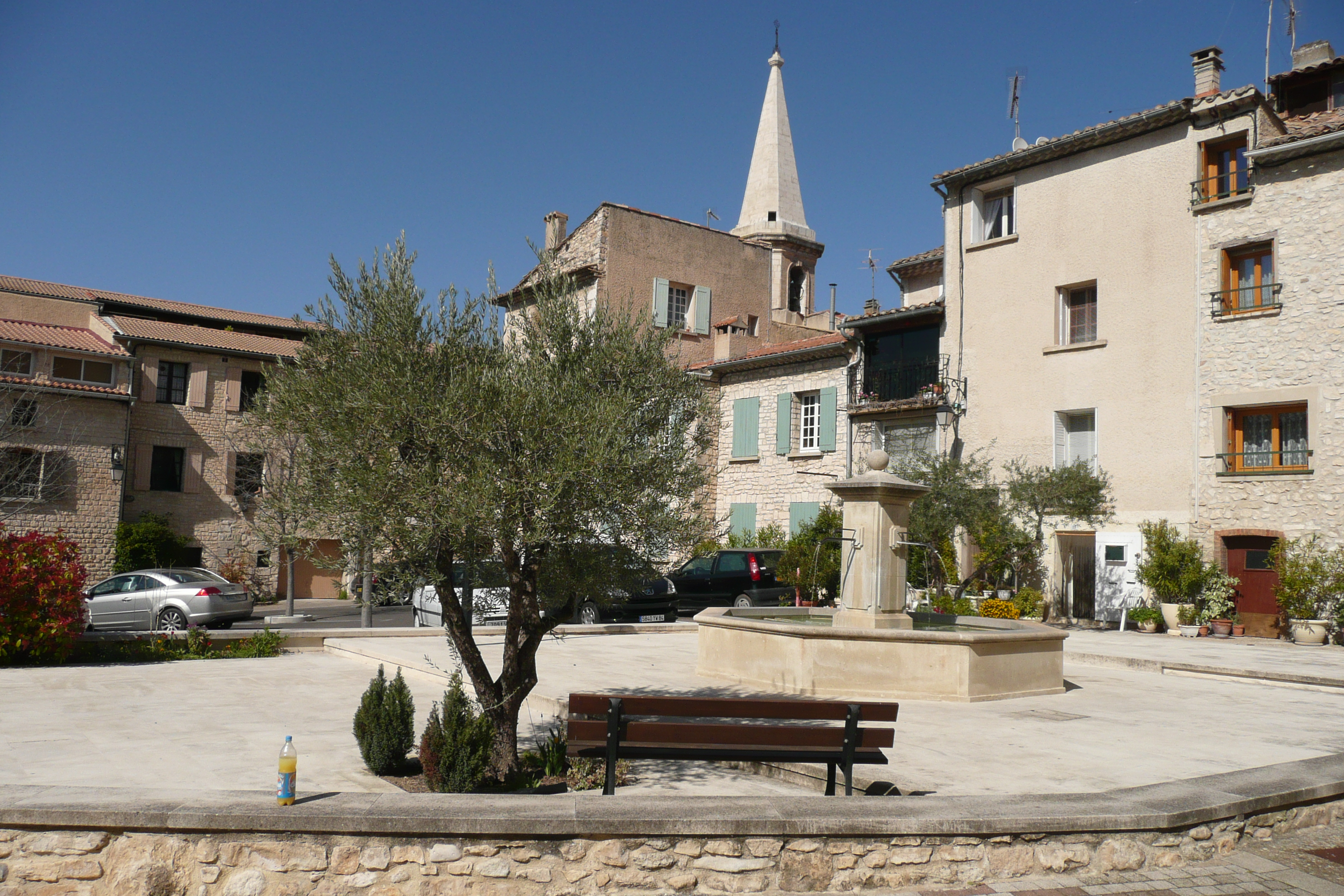
- The village square with a fountain, in Saint-Didier

- Coat of arms
- Location of Saint-Didier
- Location within France Location within Provence-Alpes-Côte d'Azur
- Coordinates: 44°00′25″N 5°06′36″E
- Country: France
- Region: Provence-Alpes-Côte d'Azur
- Department: Vaucluse
- Arrondissement: Carpentras
- Canton: Pernes-les-Fontaines
- Intercommunality: CA Ventoux-Comtat Venaissin

Government
  - Mayor (2020–2026): Gilles Vève
- Area^{1}: 3.62 km^{2} (1.40 sq mi)
- Elevation: 184 m (604 ft)
- Highest elevation: 262 m (860 ft)
- Lowest elevation: 127 m (417 ft)
- Population (2023): 2,208
  - Density: 610/km^{2} (1,580/sq mi)
- Time zone: UTC+01:00 (CET)
  - Summer (DST): UTC+02:00 (CEST)
- INSEE/Postal code: 84108 /84210
- ^{1} French Land Register data, which excludes lakes, ponds, glaciers > 1 km^{2} (0.386 sq mi or 247 acres) and river estuaries.

Saint-Didier (French pronunciation: [sɛ̃ didje]; Provençal: Sant Deidier) is a commune in the Vaucluse department in the Provence-Alpes-Côte d'Azur region in southeastern France.

== History ==
The original castrum was sold to Franco, the bishop of Carpentras, in 1160, by Raymond V, Count of Toulouse and Marquis of Provence. It was on this occasion that the name S. Desiderii was used for the first time.

Saint-Didier was formerly called Saint-Didier-les-Bains in 1918 due to its thermal spas located in the commune and its prestigious accommodation facilities for treating various diseases through thermalism. In 1665, the construction of a chapel dedicated to the Virgin began, and on June 9, 1666, it was consecrated under the name of Notre-Dame de Sainte-Garde and welcomed pilgrims. Gradually expanded, Sainte-Garde became a place of retreat and study. During the French Revolution, the buildings were sold in 1792 and successively transformed into a farm, a glassworks, and a silk factory.

== Geography ==
A small village in Provence, Saint-Didier is located to the east of Avignon, not far from Carpentras and Pernes-les-Fontaines. The village lies at the foot of the Vaucluse Mountains, and to the northeast, there is a view of Mont Ventoux.

The nearest highway is the A7 autoroute, and the nearest TGV train station is in Avignon TGV station.

== Population ==
Historical population
Year	Pop.	±% p.a.
1968	1,024	—
1975	1,067	+0.59%
1982	1,313	+3.01%
1990	1,657	+2.95%
1999	1,847	+1.21%
2007	2,048	+1.30%
2012	2,147	+0.95%
2017	2,144	−0.03%
2023	2,208	+0.49%
Source: INSEE

== Places to see ==
- Thézan Castle
- Saint-Didier church
- Sainte-Garde-des-Champs convent

== See also ==
- Communes of the Vaucluse department
