= Venasque =

Venasque Venasca (Occitan)
- Commune
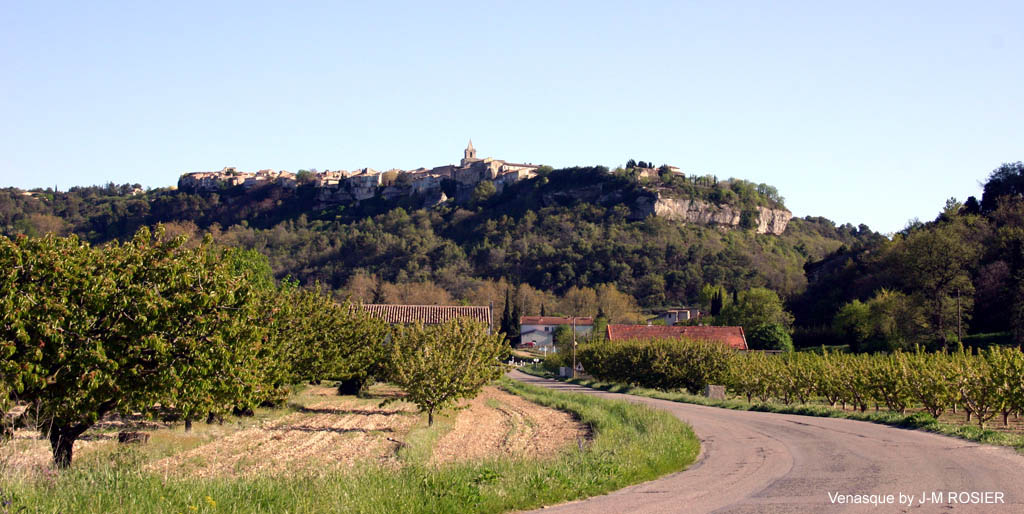
- A general view of Venasque

- Coat of arms
- Location of Venasque
- Location within France Location within Provence-Alpes-Côte d'Azur
- Coordinates: 43°59′49″N 5°08′50″E
- Country: France
- Region: Provence-Alpes-Côte d'Azur
- Department: Vaucluse
- Arrondissement: Carpentras
- Canton: Pernes-les-Fontaines
- Intercommunality: CA Ventoux-Comtat Venaissin

Government
  - Mayor (2020–2026): Dominique Plancher
- Area^{1}: 35.01 km^{2} (13.52 sq mi)
- Elevation: 310 m (1,020 ft)
- Highest elevation: 639 m (2,096 ft)
- Lowest elevation: 137 m (449 ft)
- Population (2023): 1,082
  - Density: 30.91/km^{2} (80.04/sq mi)
- Time zone: UTC+01:00 (CET)
  - Summer (DST): UTC+02:00 (CEST)
- INSEE/Postal code: 84143 /84210
- ^{1} French Land Register data, which excludes lakes, ponds, glaciers > 1 km^{2} (0.386 sq mi or 247 acres) and river estuaries.

Venasque (French pronunciation: [vənask]; Occitan: Venasca; Latin: Vendasca) is a commune in the Vaucluse department in the Provence-Alpes-Côte d'Azur region in southeastern France. It is a member of Les Plus Beaux Villages de France (The Most Beautiful Villages of France) Association.

The area has many tourist attractions, such as the nearby Mount Vaucluse, a park with several tennis courts, and many open areas. The town of Venasque stands on a hill, surrounded on all sides by ramparts in various states of disrepair. It is home to many notable foreigners, such as Darius Brubeck. It has a beautiful forest surrounding it, with picturesque trails and several shepherds' dwellings made out of rocks piled together to create domed huts.

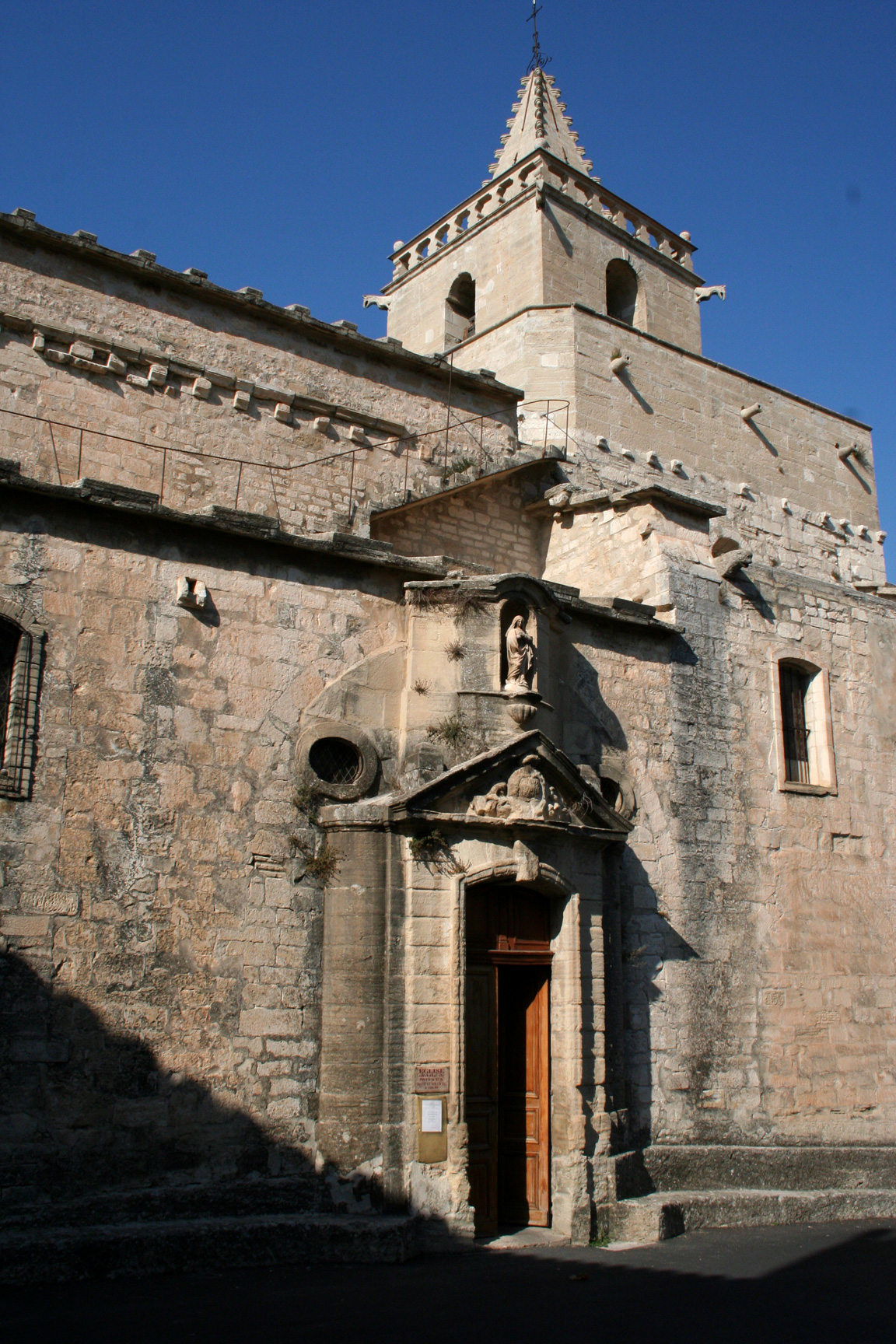
Venasque church

== History ==
In the high middle ages Venasque was the capital of the Comtat Venaissin, which became a possession of the Holy See in 1271. In 1320 Venasque was replaced as capital of the Comtat by Carpentras. Papal control of the Comtat continued until the 1790s, when it was annexed by France and placed within a new département of the Vaucluse, although the papacy did not recognise the annexation until 1814.

== See also ==
- Comtat Venaissin
- Communes of the Vaucluse department
- Port de Venasque, a mountain pass in the Pyrenees
