= Blauvac =

- Commune
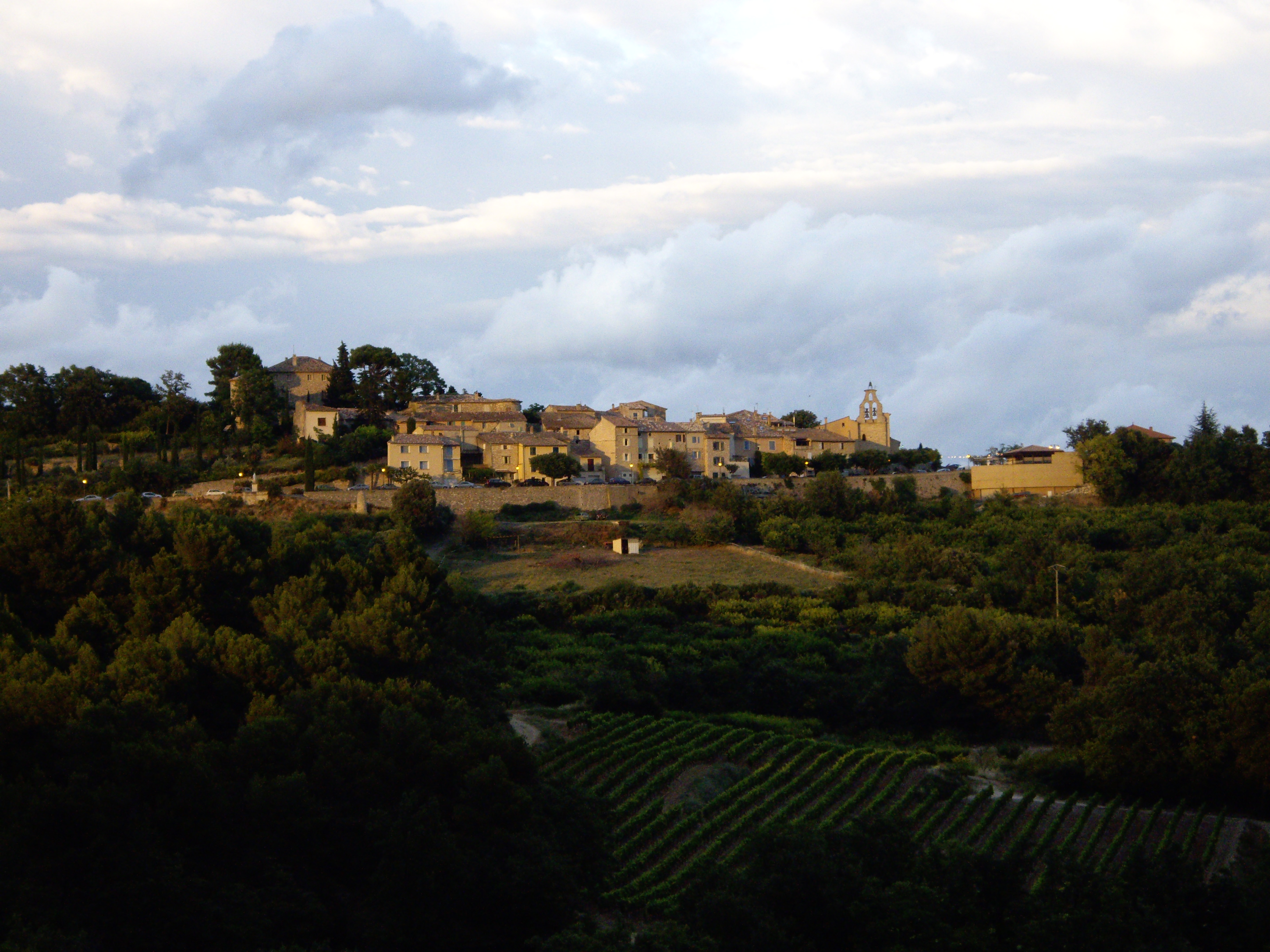
- A general view of Blauvac

- Coat of arms
- Location of Blauvac
- Location within France Location within Provence-Alpes-Côte d'Azur
- Coordinates: 44°01′52″N 5°11′59″E
- Country: France
- Region: Provence-Alpes-Côte d'Azur
- Department: Vaucluse
- Arrondissement: Carpentras
- Canton: Pernes-les-Fontaines
- Intercommunality: Ventoux Sud

Government
  - Mayor (2020–2026): Max Raspail
- Area^{1}: 20.8 km^{2} (8.0 sq mi)
- Elevation: 420 m (1,380 ft)
- Highest elevation: 831 m (2,726 ft)
- Lowest elevation: 224 m (735 ft)
- Population (2023): 573
  - Density: 27.5/km^{2} (71.3/sq mi)
- Time zone: UTC+01:00 (CET)
  - Summer (DST): UTC+02:00 (CEST)
- INSEE/Postal code: 84018 /84570
- ^{1} French Land Register data, which excludes lakes, ponds, glaciers > 1 km^{2} (0.386 sq mi or 247 acres) and river estuaries.

Blauvac (French pronunciation: [blovak]) is a commune in the Vaucluse department in the Provence-Alpes-Côte d'Azur region in southeastern France.

== Notable people ==
- Georges Hugon (23 July 1904 – 19 June 1980), French composer, died in Blauvac

== See also ==
- Communes of the Vaucluse department
