= Aurel, Vaucluse =

Aurel
- Commune
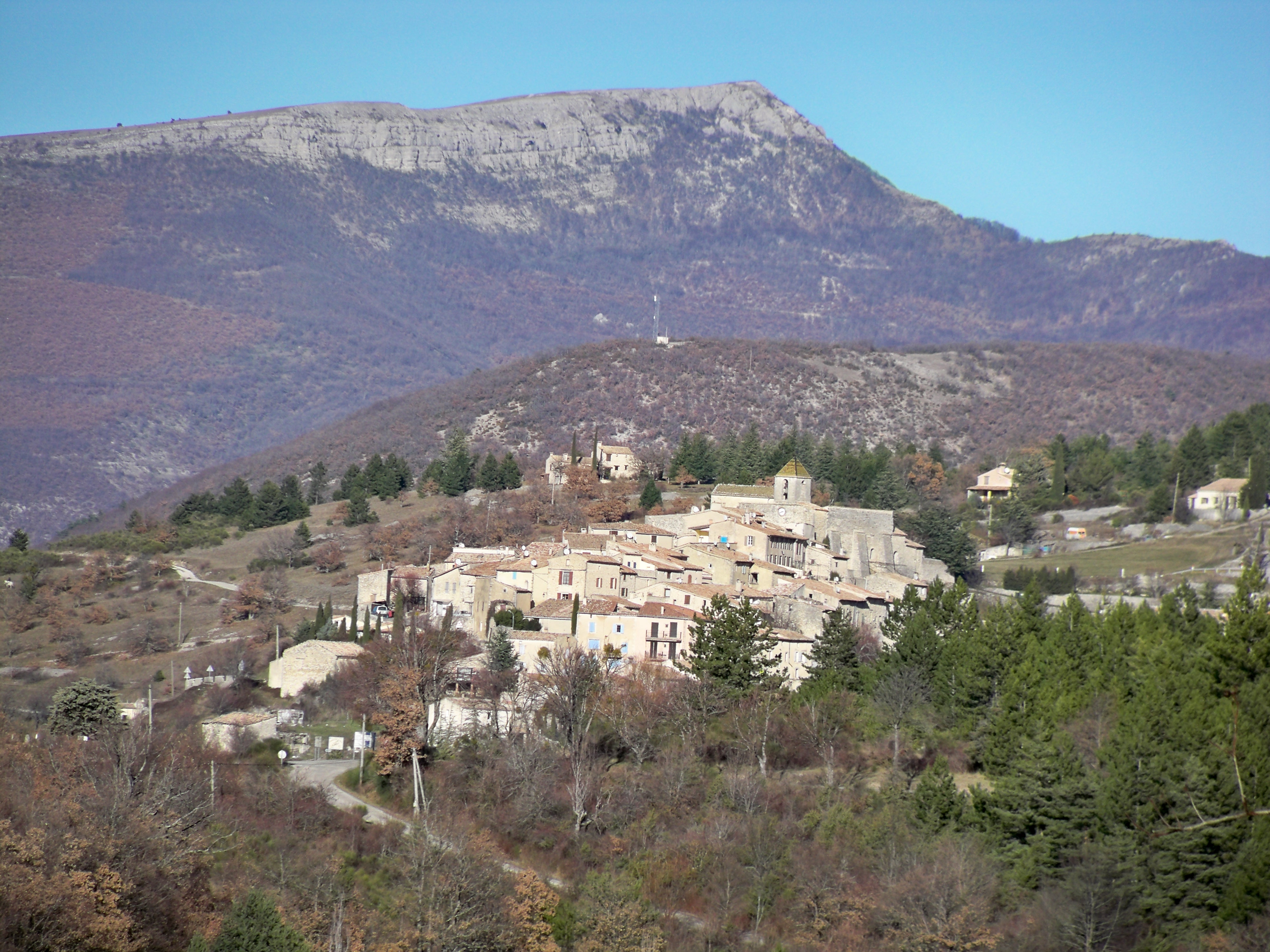
- A general view of the village of Aurel

- Coat of arms
- Location of Aurel
- Location within France Location within Provence-Alpes-Côte d'Azur
- Coordinates: 44°07′50″N 5°25′45″E
- Country: France
- Region: Provence-Alpes-Côte d'Azur
- Department: Vaucluse
- Arrondissement: Carpentras
- Canton: Pernes-les-Fontaines
- Intercommunality: CC Ventoux Sud

Government
  - Mayor (2022–2026): Cyril Falques
- Area^{1}: 28.9 km^{2} (11.2 sq mi)
- Elevation: 800 m (2,600 ft)
- Highest elevation: 1,600 m (5,200 ft)
- Lowest elevation: 615 m (2,018 ft)
- Population (2023): 190
  - Density: 6.6/km^{2} (17/sq mi)
- Time zone: UTC+01:00 (CET)
  - Summer (DST): UTC+02:00 (CEST)
- INSEE/Postal code: 84005 /84390
- ^{1} French Land Register data, which excludes lakes, ponds, glaciers > 1 km^{2} (0.386 sq mi or 247 acres) and river estuaries.

Aurel (French pronunciation: [oʁɛl]; Occitan: Aurèu) is a commune in the Vaucluse department in the Provence-Alpes-Côte d'Azur region in southeastern France.

== See also ==
- Communes of the Vaucluse department
