= Canton of Pernes-les-Fontaines =

Coordinates: 43°59′15″N 5°05′46″E

Pernes-les-Fontaines
- Canton
- Country: France
- Region: Provence-Alpes-Côte d'Azur
- Department: Vaucluse
- No. of communes: {{{nbcomm}}}
- Area: 648.21 km^{2} (250.28 sq mi)
- Population (2023): 35,422
  - Density: 54.646/km^{2} (141.53/sq mi)
- INSEE code: 84 12

The canton of Pernes-les-Fontaines is a French administrative division in the department of Vaucluse and region Provence-Alpes-Côte d'Azur.

== Composition ==
At the French canton reorganisation which came into effect in March 2015, the canton was expanded from 6 to 21 communes:

- Aurel
- Le Beaucet
- Bédoin
- Blauvac
- Crillon-le-Brave
- Flassan
- Malemort-du-Comtat
- Mazan
- Méthamis
- Modène
- Monieux
- Mormoiron
- Pernes-les-Fontaines
- La Roque-sur-Pernes
- Saint-Christol
- Saint-Didier
- Saint-Pierre-de-Vassols
- Saint-Trinit
- Sault
- Venasque
- Villes-sur-Auzon
