= Mormoiron =

Mormoiron Mormeiron (Occitan)
- Commune
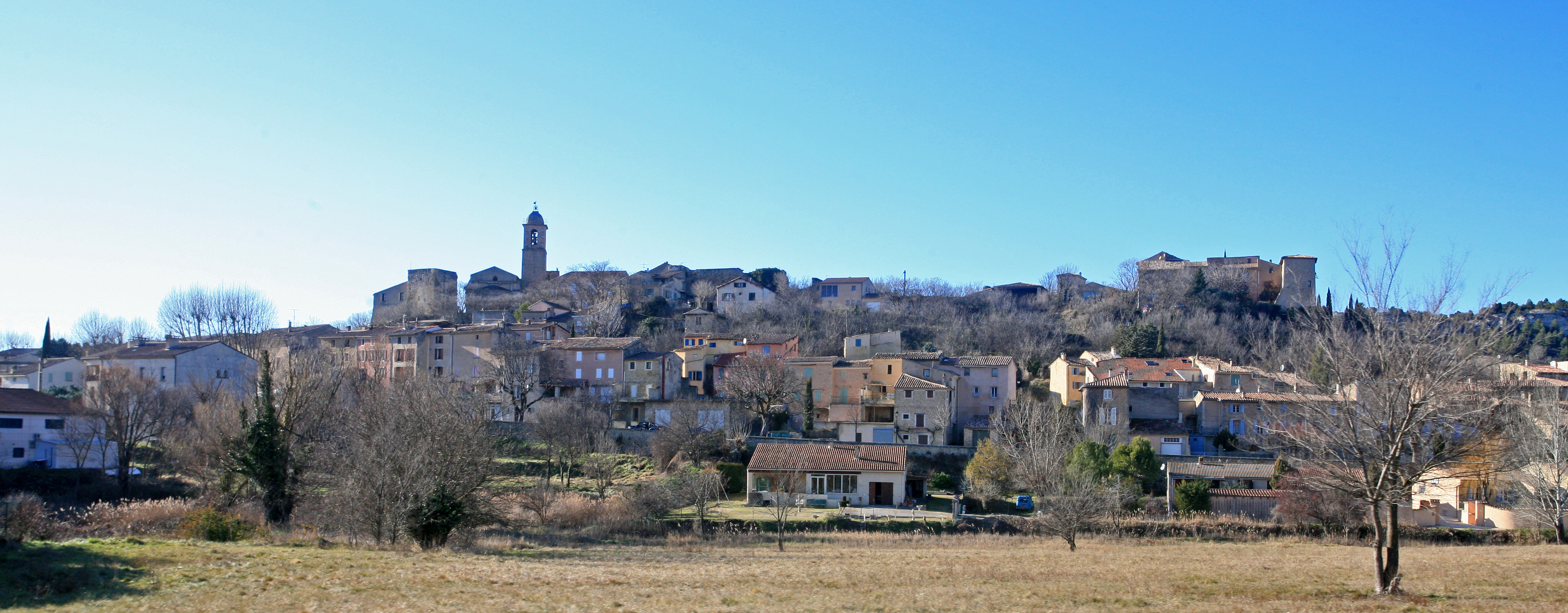
- A view of Mormoiron

- Coat of arms
- Location of Mormoiron
- Location within France Location within Provence-Alpes-Côte d'Azur
- Coordinates: 44°04′07″N 5°11′02″E
- Country: France
- Region: Provence-Alpes-Côte d'Azur
- Department: Vaucluse
- Arrondissement: Carpentras
- Canton: Pernes-les-Fontaines
- Intercommunality: Ventoux Sud

Government
  - Mayor (2020–2026): Régis Silvestre
- Area^{1}: 25.03 km^{2} (9.66 sq mi)
- Elevation: 281 m (922 ft)
- Highest elevation: 450 m (1,480 ft)
- Lowest elevation: 179 m (587 ft)
- Population (2023): 1,884
  - Density: 75.27/km^{2} (194.9/sq mi)
- Time zone: UTC+01:00 (CET)
  - Summer (DST): UTC+02:00 (CEST)
- INSEE/Postal code: 84082 /84570
- ^{1} French Land Register data, which excludes lakes, ponds, glaciers > 1 km^{2} (0.386 sq mi or 247 acres) and river estuaries.

Mormoiron (French pronunciation: [mɔʁmwaʁɔ̃]; Occitan: Mormeiron) is a commune in the Vaucluse department in the Provence-Alpes-Côte d'Azur region in Southeastern France. As of 2023, the population of the commune was 1,884.

== Geography and geology ==
Mormoiron is located 12 km East of Carpentras; also nearby are Mont Ventoux and Avignon. The soil is mainly composed of sand, ochre and gypsum.

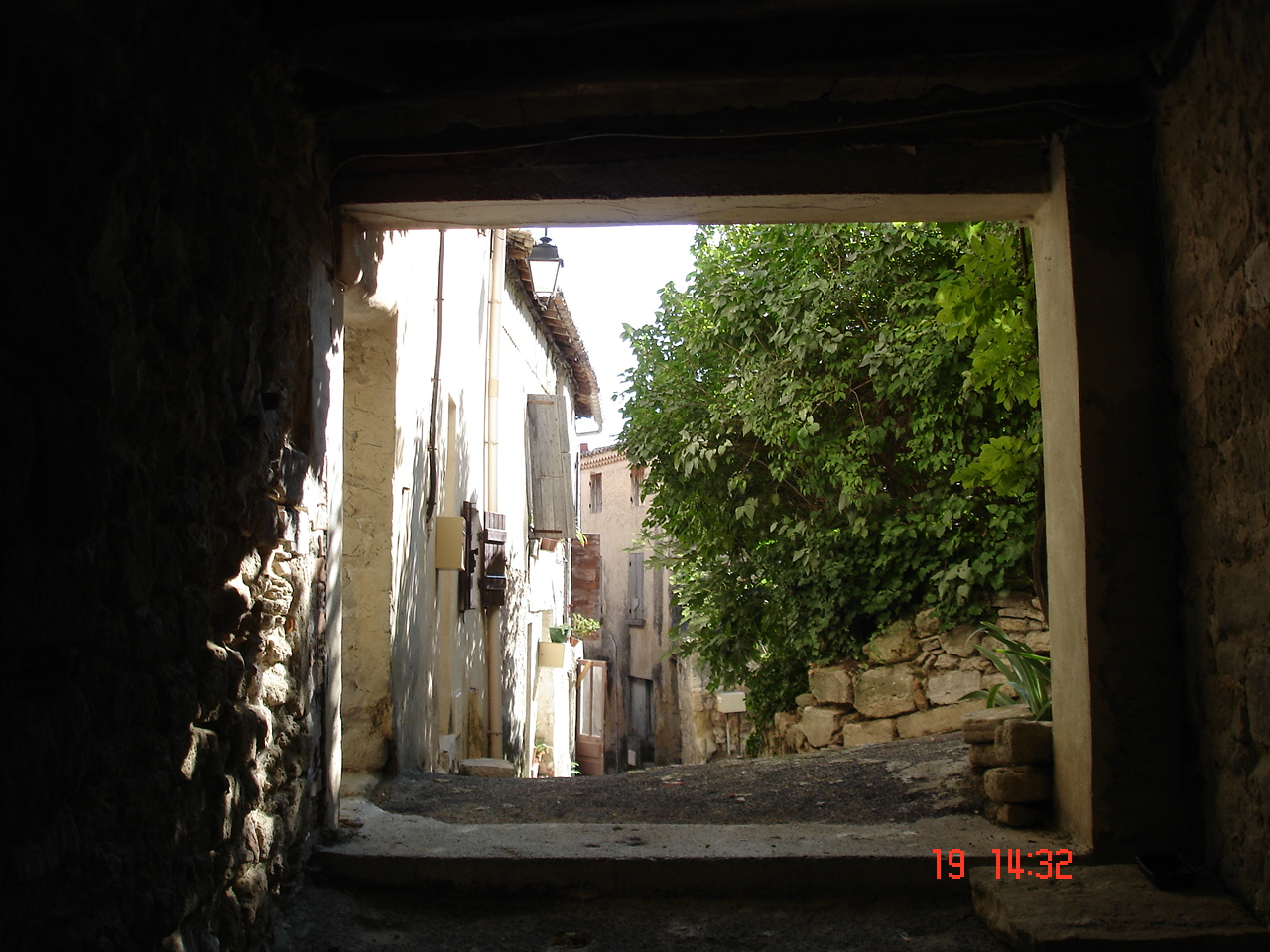
The Village

== Prehistory and antiquity ==
The commune's area was occupied prehistorically (approximately 100,000 BC), as is evidenced by the discovery of bifaces and pottery. Evidence from the twenty-first century BC points to trade relations with Phocaea and ancient Marseille.

Roman colonization left behind altars to Mercury, coins from the Augustan and Trajan reigns, and various other artefacts.

The siege walls surrounding 16th century Porte du Brochier and the 17th century Porte de la Bonne Font are still present today.

== See also ==
- Communes of the Vaucluse department
