= Sault, Vaucluse =

Sault Saut (Occitan)
- Commune
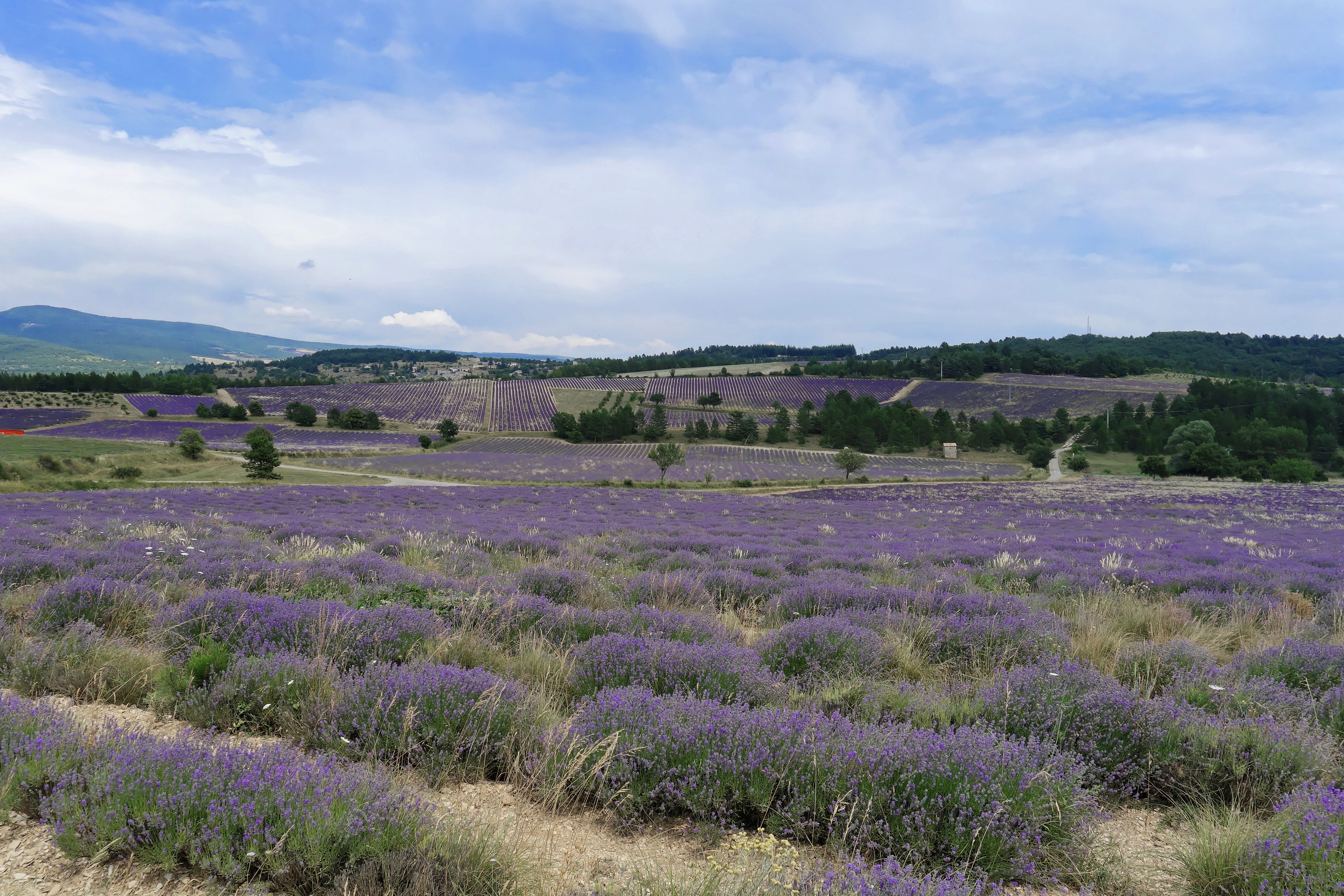
- Lavender fields in Sault

- Coat of arms
- Location of Sault
- Location within France Location within Provence-Alpes-Côte d'Azur
- Coordinates: 44°05′31″N 5°24′29″E
- Country: France
- Region: Provence-Alpes-Côte d'Azur
- Department: Vaucluse
- Arrondissement: Carpentras
- Canton: Pernes-les-Fontaines
- Intercommunality: Ventoux Sud

Government
  - Mayor (2020–2026): Claude Labro
- Area^{1}: 111.15 km^{2} (42.92 sq mi)
- Elevation: 760 m (2,490 ft)
- Highest elevation: 1,591 m (5,220 ft)
- Lowest elevation: 650 m (2,130 ft)
- Population (2023): 1,343
  - Density: 12.08/km^{2} (31.29/sq mi)
- Demonym: Saltésiens
- Time zone: UTC+01:00 (CET)
  - Summer (DST): UTC+02:00 (CEST)
- INSEE/Postal code: 84123 /84390
- Website: mairie-sault-84.fr
- ^{1} French Land Register data, which excludes lakes, ponds, glaciers > 1 km^{2} (0.386 sq mi or 247 acres) and river estuaries.

Sault (French pronunciation: [so]; Occitan: Saut), also known as Sault-en-Provence, is a commune in the Vaucluse department in the southeastern Provence-Alpes-Côte d'Azur French region. It is located just north of the Luberon massif, not far from the departmental border with Drôme to the north and Alpes-de-Haute-Provence to the east. As of 2023, the population of the commune was 1,343.

== Geography ==
Sault is located in the canton of Pernes-les-Fontaines, in the Carpentras district, in the Vaucluse department, in the Provence-Alpes-Côte d'Azur region of France. Geographically, it is a rural area known for its expansive views, rolling landscapes, and proximity to the Vaucluse Mountains. Sault is one of the 77 communes that make up the canton and is often referred to as Sault en Provence to distinguish it from the rest of France. With an area of 111.15 km², Sault is the largest commune in the Albion Plateau. The plateau covers a total area of approximately 490.8 km² and is a key component of the Vaucluse Mountain system. The Sault region lies between 650 and 1,591 meters above sea level, offering a diverse topography, ranging from fertile valleys to limestone mountains.

== Climate ==
Sault is located in a unique transition zone that combines characteristics of a mountain climate with a Mediterranean climate. This combination results in significant weather variations throughout the year, particularly between warm, dry summers and long, snowy winters. These climatic conditions are also influenced by the region's altitude and the geography of the Albion Plateau, which is exposed to winds and extreme temperature changes.

=== Summer ===
Summer in the Sault lasts approximately 2.8 months, from June to September. During this period, the weather tends to be warm and dry, with average daily temperatures above 22 °C. July is the peak of summer, with daily temperatures ranging between 13.8 °C and 25.5 °C. During this month, the Sault receives one of the highest amounts of sunshine of the year, with between 371 and 402 hours, or approximately 12.97 hours per day. These conditions significantly support agricultural activities and tourism, particularly the lavender blooming season, which is a characteristic of the Sault region.

=== Winter ===
Winter in the Sault is longer, lasting approximately 3.6 months, from November to March. This period is characterized by low temperatures, snow, and often cloudy skies. The average daily temperature during winter is below 9.4 °C, with January being the coldest month. During this month, temperatures can drop as low as -2 °C and rarely exceed 6 °C. During winter, the Sault receives significantly less sunlight. In January, the Sault region receives only 145 to 189 hours of sunshine, or an average of 6.11 hours per day. Even in December, the Sault receives only about 135 hours of sunshine per month, or just 4.5 hours per day.

== Economy ==
Sault's economy relies on the complementary sectors of agriculture, livestock farming, and tourism. Its vast territory on the Albion Plateau provides significant opportunities for agricultural development, including the cultivation of lavender, wheat, and other aromatic crops. Lavender, in particular, has made the Sault one of the centers of essential oils and lavender-derived products in Provence, attracting many tourists each flowering season.

Sheep and cattle farming is another important sector, supported by extensive pastures and centuries-old pastoral traditions. Dairy products, local cheeses, and meats are part of the local economy, marketed both within the commune and in the surrounding region. Tourism plays a significant role, particularly through ecotourism, hiking, nature watching, and lavender tourism. The panoramic views of the plateau, pine forests, and mountain air make Sault a popular destination for tourists seeking a quintessential Provence experience.

== See also ==
- Communes of the Vaucluse department
