= List of castles in Provence-Alpes-Côte d'Azur =

This list of castles in Provence-Alpes-Côte d'Azur is a list of medieval castles or châteaus forts in the region in southern France.

Links in italics are links to articles in the French Wikipedia.

== Alpes-de-Haute-Provence ==
Name	Date	Condition	Image	Ownership / Access	Notes
Château de Simiane-la-Rotonde	12-14th century	Ruins			
Citadelle de Sisteron	14-15th century	Substantially intact			Fortifications renewed 1590-7.
Château des Templiers de Gréoux-les-Bains	13-16th century	Substantially intact		Commune	Converted to residence 16th century.

== Alpes-Maritimes ==
Castles of which little remains include Château de Roquefort.

Name	Date	Condition	Image	Ownership / Access	Notes
Château Grimaldi d'Antibes		Restored			Houses Picasso museum.
Château de Gourdon	12th century	Rebuilt			Remodelled 18th century.
Château de Lucéram	12th/13th century	Ruin		Property of commune	
Château de la Napoule	14th century	Restored			
Château de Nice		Fragmentary remains			
Château de Roquebrune-Cap-Martin					
Château de Villeneuve-Loubet	13th century	Restored		Private	

== Bouches-du-Rhône ==
Name	Date	Condition	Image	Ownership / Access	Notes
Château des Baux	11-13th century	Ruins			
Château de Boulbon		Ruins			
Château de l'Empéri	13th century	Restored			Dates from 9th century, altered 15-16th centuries.
Château d'If	1524-31	Ruins			On an island in the Bay of Marseille, used as prison, featured in The Count of Monte Cristo.
Château de Ners	12th century	Ruins			
Château de Tarascon	15th century	Intact			Converted into a military prison in the 17th century.
Château de Vernègues	Medieval	Ruins		Property of the commune	Destroyed 11 June 1909 by the Lambesc earthquake.

== Hautes-Alpes ==
Name	Date	Condition	Image	Ownership / Access	Notes
Château de Lesdiguières	16th century	Ruins			
Château de Saint-Firmin		Ruins			
Fort Queyras	13th-17th century	Intact		Private but open to visits in summer	Strategic location above the Guil gorges. A first construction might have been built even earlier than the 13th century.

== Var ==
Name	Date	Condition	Image	Ownership / Access	Notes
Château de Bargème		Ruins			
Château de Pontevès	13th century	Ruins			Altered and rebuilt before falling into ruin.

== Vaucluse ==
Name	Date	Condition	Image	Ownership / Access	Notes
Palais des Papes, Avignon	14th century	Restored			Taken over by Napoleonic French state for use as a military barracks and prison.
Château de Beaumont le Vieux	End of 10th century	Ruin			
Château de Crestet					
Château d'Entrechaux	10th-11th century	Undergoing restoration			
Château de Lacoste		Ruins			A residence of the Marquis de Sade, destroyed during the French Revolution.
Château de Mornas	11-14th century	Ruins			
Château de Murs	12-18th century	Restored			
Château de Pétrarque		Ruins			
Château de Thouzon		Ruins			
Château de Vaison-la-Romaine		Ruins			

== See also ==
- List of castles in France
- List of châteaux in France
