= Château d'Entrechaux =

Coordinates: 44°13′11″N 5°08′17″E

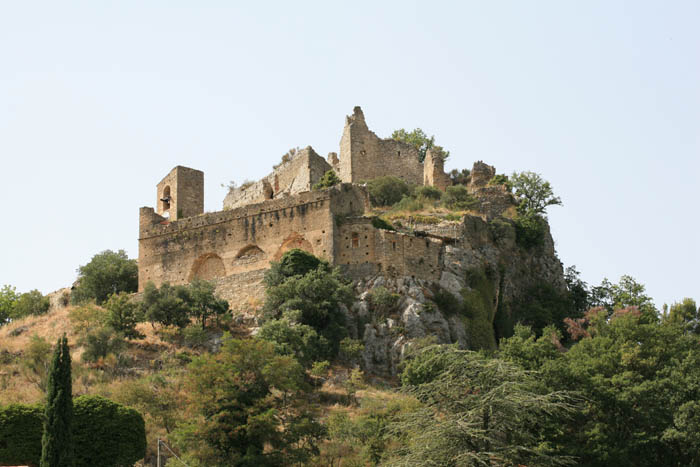
Ruins of the Château d'Entrechaux

The Château d'Entrechaux is a ruined castle in the commune of Entrechaux in the Vaucluse département of France.

The castle stands on a rocky peak above the village and is undergoing restoration. From the site, there is a good view of the village and of the surrounding area, extending to the castles at Crestet and Beaumont-du-Ventoux. Entrechaux, the Château de Crestet and the Château de Beaumont-du-Ventoux formed an effective lookout network.

Mainly dating from the 10th or 11th centuries, the Château d'Entrechaux is actually two castles. Begun around 900, the Petit Château (Little Castle), with its fortified chapel dedicated to St Quenin and a cistern dug into the rock, was built by the Bishops of Vaison. During a long period of dispute with the Counts of Toulouse, this castle was shared with the village lord. The latter constructed the Grand Château (Big Castle), below the first, with a square keep more than 20 metres high, a chapel dedicated to St Laurent and several other buildings, surrounded by ramparts. A gatehouse with a bretèche served both castles. The joint ownership lasted for about 450 years from c.1230.

A band of outlaws pillaged and began the destruction of the castle on 9 September 1792. The sale of stones by the municipality and vandalism by inhabitants led to its ruin. The castle was treated as a quarry.

The castle is private property. Visits are possible during the summer.

== See also ==
- List of castles in France
