= 1909 Benavente earthquake =

Earthquake affecting Portugal

- Location within Portugal
- UTC time: 1909-04-23 17:39:36
- ISC event
- USGS-ANSS: ComCat
- Local date: 23 April 1909
- Local time: 17:39 GMT
- Magnitude: M_{w} 6.0
- Depth: 10 km (6.2 mi)
- Epicenter: 38.9°N 8.8°W
- Areas affected: Lisbon, Portugal
- Max. intensity: MMI IX (Violent)
- Casualties: 30–60 dead, 75 injured

The 1909 Benavente earthquake occurred on 23 April at 17:39 GMT with an epicenter in the Lisbon region of Portugal. The earthquake had an estimated moment magnitude of 6.0 and had maximum Mercalli intensity of IX (Violent). Beneath the Lower Tagus Valley, where the earthquake occurred, is a system of normal faults that were reactivated during the Eocene as reverse faults. The earthquake was caused by movement along one of these buried faults. At least 30 people died and 75 people were injured; the towns of Samora Correia and Muge in Benavente were the hardest-hit, with 90 percent of it destroyed. Another 13,000 people were made homeless. In Lisbon, the earthquake caused minor damage to some homes, started fires, and injured several people.

== Geology ==
The Lower Tagus Valley is a northeast-trending rift in Portugal. It occupies a 3,200 km^{2} (1,200 sq mi) area and extends to Lisbon at its southern end. During the Eocene, the rift underwent inversion which caused pre-existing normal faults to reactivate as reverse faults. One of these faults is the Vila Franca de Xira Fault, a southeast-dipping reverse fault located along the northwestern edge of the valley. The Azambuja Fault is another major structure that lies roughly parallel to the aforementioned fault on the east side of the valley. Beneath the valley is a highly segmented system of faults that trend north-northwest–south-southeast to northwest–southeast, diagonal to the general direction of the valley. Some faults are also oriented north-northeast–south-southwest. These faults are buried under thick layers of sediment and their slip rates are estimated at 0.1 to 0.05 mm (0.0039 to 0.0020 in) per year.

The area is seismically active and has produced several significant earthquakes within historical times. In the last 30 years of the 20th century, at least 39 earthquakes had been felt; three with magnitudes of at least 4.0 while 16 events were between 3.0 and 3.9. The first documented earthquake in the region occurred on 26 January 1531. With an estimated magnitude at M_{w} 6.9, it caused serious damage in Lisbon and killed two percent of the population.

== Earthquake ==
The earthquake struck with an epicenter in the Alcochete municipality of Lisbon on 23 April at 17:39 GMT. In a study published in Seismological Research Letters, the earthquake had a moment magnitude of 6.0, while past estimates placed it at 6.6. It was the largest recorded crustal earthquake in the Iberian Peninsula during the 20th century. It was felt for 215,000 km^{2} (83,000 sq mi), a relatively large area for its magnitude. In comparison, the 1908 Messina earthquake which measured 7.2 had a felt area less than one third of that.

A group of researchers analysed 29 seismograms of the earthquake from 13 seismic stations in Spain, France, Italy, Germany, the Netherlands and Sweden, and published their findings in Geophysical Journal International. Their analysis indicated that the earthquake was likely caused by reverse faulting along a buried northeast–southwest striking fault. No causative fault has been identified, although a possible candidate is a postulated northeast–southwest striking fault connecting the Vila Franca de Xira and Azambuja faults or the southern segment of the latter structure. The existence of the former structure has only been inferred from reflection seismology. Although surface fissures and sand volcanoes were observed in the ground, there were no documented surface ruptures from the earthquake. If surface ruptures were to occur, they were very likely small and may have been destroyed due to periodic flooding of the valley.

== Impact ==
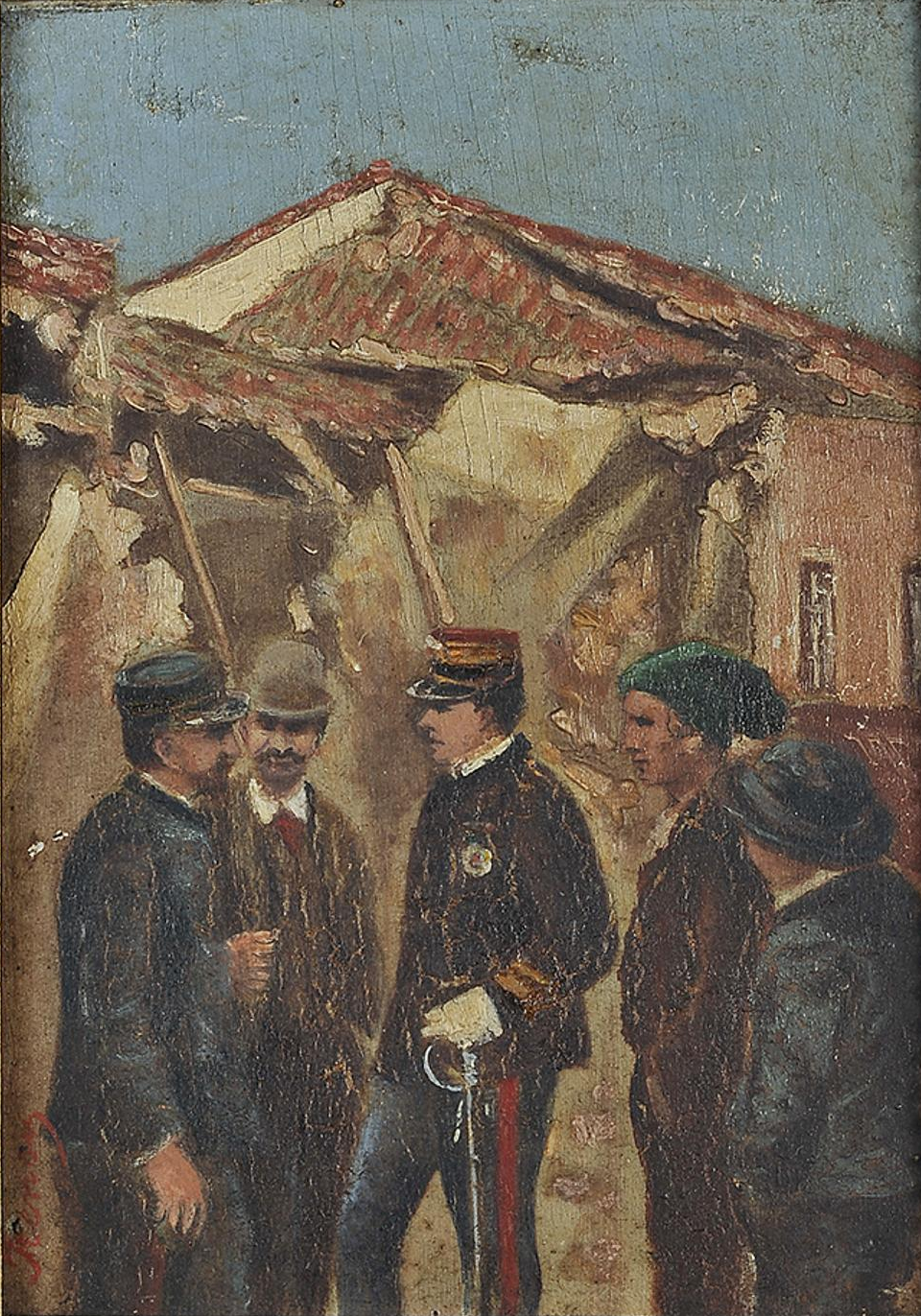
Painting of King Manuel II in Benavente after the earthquake

The earthquake was assigned a maximum Mercalli-Cancani intensity of X (Extreme) near the epicenter, over 450 km^{2} (170 sq mi). Liquefaction occurred in the Tagus and Sorraia river plains. At Lisbon, 30 km (19 mi) away, the shaking was felt VI (Strong). Intensity VI was also felt in the cities of Setúbal and Évora, causing some damage, while intensity V shaking was felt in Spain. A reassessment of the maximum intensity on the Modified Mercalli intensity scale in 1956 revised the maximum intensity to IX (Violent).

According to Público, at least 60 people were reported killed including 46 deaths in Benavente, and 75 people were severely injured. Many people were outdoors working in the fields at the time, which may have prevented further deaths. A report by the Ottawa Citizen citing Portuguese officials said 13,000 people were homeless. The National Geophysical Data Center listed the number of deaths at 30.

In Benavente, the towns of Samora Correia and Muge sustained the heaviest damage; nearly 90 percent of these towns were destroyed. Forty percent of buildings in Benavente were razed or had to be torn down, and another 40 percent required repairs. In Santo Estevao, only 46 of the 207 buildings remained intact. Several churches were also damaged; most had cracks in their walls but the greatest damage was inflicted on the Misericórdia Church when its ceiling collapsed onto the altar. At the nearby seminary, plasters fell along the corridor. In Lisbon, several people were injured, the walls of some homes cracked and fires occurred in the southern part of the city.

== See also ==
- List of earthquakes in 1909
- List of earthquakes in Portugal
- 1909 Provence earthquake
