= Ane River =

River in Japan

Coordinates: 35°23′17″N 136°12′54″E

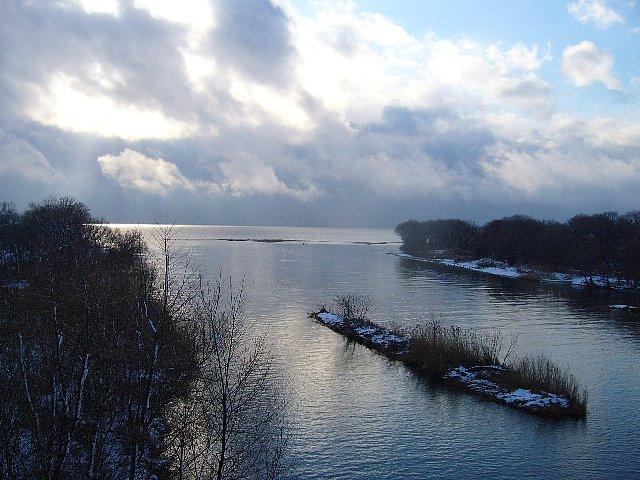
- Lake Biwa seen from the mouth of the Ane River

- Location within Japan

The Ane River (Japanese: 姉川, romanized: Anegawa) is a river that flows through the northern part of Shiga Prefecture, Japan, entering Lake Biwa at the city of Nagahama.

== See also ==
- Battle of Anegawa
- 1909 Anegawa earthquake
