= List of earthquakes in 1909 =

Earthquakes in 1909
Approximate epicenters of the earthquakes in 1909
- 4.0–5.9 magnitude
- 6.0–6.9 magnitude
- 7.0–7.9 magnitude
- 8.0+ magnitude
- Strongest: Afghanistan, Nurestan Province (Magnitude 7.7) July 7
- Deadliest: Iran, Markazi Province January 23 (Magnitude 7.3) 8,000 deaths
- Total fatalities: 8,689

Number by magnitude
- 9.0+: 0

This is a list of earthquakes in 1909. Only notable magnitude 6.0 or greater earthquakes appear on the list. Lower magnitude events are included if they have caused death, injury or damage. Events which occurred in remote areas will be excluded from the list as they wouldn't have generated significant media interest All dates are listed according to UTC time. This year was marked by a large increase in the number of events that caused deaths and damage compared to 1908.

== Overall ==
=== By death toll ===
| Rank | Death toll | Magnitude | Location | MMI | Depth (km) | Date |
|---|---|---|---|---|---|---|
| 1 | 8,000 | 7.3 | Iran, Markazi Province | ( ) | 15.0 | January 23 |
| 2 | 231 | 7.0 | British Raj, Sind Province | ( ) | 35.0 | October 20 |
| = 3 | 101 | 6.3 | Turkey, Sivas Province | IX (Violent) | 15.0 | February 9 |
| = 3 | 101 | 7.2 | Dutch East Indies, west central Sumatra | ( ) | 0.0 | June 3 |
| 4 | 100 | 0.0 | Morocco, Tetouan Province | ( ) | 0.0 | January 29 |
| 5 | 41 | 6.7 | Japan, Shiga Prefecture | ( ) | 5.0 | August 14 |
| 6 | 40 | 6.2 | France, Vaucluse | X (Extreme) | 0.0 | June 11 |
| 7 | 30 | 6.6 | Portugal, Santarem District | X (Extreme) | 0.0 | April 23 |
| 8 | 21 | 6.5 | China, Yunnan Province | VIII (Severe) | 0.0 | May 11 |
| 9 | 10 | 0.0 | Pakistan, Khyber Pakhtunkhwa | ( ) | 0.0 | July 8 |

- Note: At least 10 casualties

=== By magnitude ===
| Rank | Magnitude | Death toll | Location | MMI | Depth (km) | Date |
|---|---|---|---|---|---|---|
| 1 | 7.7 | 0 | Afghanistan, Nurestan Province | VII (Very strong) | 200.0 | July 7 |
| 2 | 7.6 | 0 | Fiji | ( ) | 550.0 | February 22 |
| = 3 | 7.5 | 0 | Mexico, off the coast of Guerrero | ( ) | 20.0 | July 30 |
| = 3 | 7.5 | 0 | Japan, Miyazaki Prefecture, Kyushu | ( ) | 150.0 | November 10 |
| 4 | 7.3 | 8,000 | Iran, Markazi Province | ( ) | 15.0 | January 23 |
| = 5 | 7.2 | 101 | Dutch East Indies, west central Sumatra | ( ) | 0.0 | June 3 |
| = 5 | 7.2 | 0 | Chile, Atacama Region | ( ) | 0.0 | June 8 |
| = 5 | 7.2 | 0 | France, southeast of the Loyalty Islands | ( ) | 100.0 | August 18 |
| = 6 | 7.1 | 0 | Japan, off the southeast coast of Honshu | ( ) | 15.0 | March 13 |
| = 6 | 7.1 | 9 | Taiwan, off the northeast coast | ( ) | 5.0 | April 14 |
| = 6 | 7.1 | 0 | Dutch East Indies, Talaud Islands | ( ) | 100.0 | April 25 |
| = 6 | 7.1 | 0 | southern Pacific Ocean | ( ) | 0.0 | April 27 |
| = 6 | 7.1 | 0 | Dutch East Indies, southwest of Yamdena | ( ) | 100.0 | May 30 |
| = 6 | 7.1 | 4 | Taiwan, north of | ( ) | 5.0 | November 21 |
| = 7 | 7.0 | 0 | United States, Rat Islands, Alaska | ( ) | 0.0 | April 10 |
| = 7 | 7.0 | 0 | Bolivia, Chuquisaca Department | ( ) | 250.0 | May 17 |
| = 7 | 7.0 | 0 | United States, Fox Islands (Alaska) | ( ) | 90.0 | September 8 |
| = 7 | 7.0 | 231 | Pakistan, Sind Province | ( ) | 35.0 | October 20 |
| = 7 | 7.0 | 0 | British Solomon Islands | ( ) | 0.0 | December 9 |

- Note: At least 7.0 magnitude

== Notable events ==
=== January ===
January
- Strongest: 7.3 M_{w} Iran
- Deadliest: 7.3 M_{w} Iran; 8,000 deaths
- Total fatalities: 8,100

Number by magnitude
- 8.0–8.9: 0
- 7.0–7.9: 1
- 6.0–6.9: 0

| Date | Country and location | M_{w} | Depth (km) | MMI | Notes | Casualties | |
| Date | Country and location | M_{w} | Depth (km) | MMI | Notes | Dead | Injured |
|---|---|---|---|---|---|---|---|
| 23 | Iran, Markazi Province | 7.3 | 15.0 | | 8,000 people died in the 1909 Borujerd earthquake. Some damage was caused in the area. | 8,000 | |
| 29 | Morocco, Tetouan | 0.0 | 0.0 | | 100 people were killed and major damage was reported. Magnitude and depth unknown. | 100 | |

=== February ===
February
- Strongest: 7.6 M_{w} Fiji
- Deadliest: 6.3 M_{w} Turkey; 101 deaths
- Total fatalities: 101

Number by magnitude
- 8.0–8.9: 0
- 7.0–7.9: 1
- 6.0–6.9: 1

| Date | Country and location | M_{w} | Depth (km) | MMI | Notes | Casualties | |
| Date | Country and location | M_{w} | Depth (km) | MMI | Notes | Dead | Injured |
|---|---|---|---|---|---|---|---|
| 9 | Turkey, Sivas Province | 6.3 | 15.0 | IX | At least 101 people were killed and major damage was caused. | 101 | |
| 22 | Fiji | 7.6 | 550.0 | | | | |

=== March ===
March
- Strongest: 7.1 M_{w} Japan
- Total fatalities: 0

Number by magnitude
- 8.0–8.9: 0
- 7.0–7.9: 1
- 6.0–6.9: 5

| Date | Country and location | M_{w} | Depth (km) | MMI | Notes | Casualties | |
| Date | Country and location | M_{w} | Depth (km) | MMI | Notes | Dead | Injured |
|---|---|---|---|---|---|---|---|
| 10 | Japan, Ryukyu Islands | 6.5 | 100.0 | | | | |
| 12 | Japan, off the southeast coast of Honshu | 6.9 | 35.0 | | Foreshock. Some damage was caused. A tsunami was observed. | | |
| 13 | Japan, off the east coast of Honshu | 7.1 | 15.0 | | Further damage was caused. Another tsunami was observed. | | |
| 17 | Japan, Izu Islands | 6.7 | 450.0 | | | | |
| 17 | Dutch East Indies, Sulawesi | 6.9 | 0.0 | | Depth unknown. | | |
| 22 | Japan, off the southeast coast of Honshu | 6.6 | 35.0 | | | | |

=== April ===
April
- Strongest: 7.1 M_{w} 3 events
- Deadliest: 6.6 M_{w} Portugal; 30 deaths
- Total fatalities: 39

Number by magnitude
- 8.0–8.9: 0
- 7.0–7.9: 4
- 6.0–6.9: 2

| Date | Country and location | M_{w} | Depth (km) | MMI | Notes | Casualties | |
| Date | Country and location | M_{w} | Depth (km) | MMI | Notes | Dead | Injured |
|---|---|---|---|---|---|---|---|
| 10 | New Hebrides, Espiritu Santo | 6.9 | 0.0 | | Depth unknown. | | |
| 10 | United States, Rat Islands, Alaska | 7.0 | 0.0 | | Depth unknown. | | |
| 14 | Taiwan, off the northeast coast | 7.1 | 5.0 | | 9 people were killed and another 51 were injured. 122 homes were destroyed. | 9 | 51 |
| 23 | Portugal, Santarem District | 6.6 | 0.0 | X | 30 people died and many homes were destroyed or damaged in the 1909 Benavente earthquake. Depth unknown. | 30 | |
| 25 | Dutch East Indies, Talaud Islands | 7.1 | 100.0 | | | | |
| 26 | Kamerun, Mount Cameroon | 0.0 | 0.0 | | Some damage was caused. Volcano nearby started erupting at this time. Magnitude and depth unknown. | | |
| 27 | southern Pacific Ocean | 7.1 | 0.0 | | Depth unknown. | | |

=== May ===
May
- Strongest: 7.1 M_{w} Dutch East Indies
- Deadliest: 6.5 M_{w} China; 21 deaths
- Total fatalities: 21

Number by magnitude
- 8.0–8.9: 0
- 7.0–7.9: 2
- 6.0–6.9: 1

| Date | Country and location | M_{w} | Depth (km) | MMI | Notes | Casualties | |
| Date | Country and location | M_{w} | Depth (km) | MMI | Notes | Dead | Injured |
|---|---|---|---|---|---|---|---|
| 11 | China, Yunnan Province | 6.5 | 0.0 | VIII | 21 people were killed and many homes were destroyed. Depth unknown. | 21 | |
| 17 | Bolivia, Chuquisaca Department | 7.0 | 250.0 | | | | |
| 30 | Dutch East Indies, southwest of Yamdena | 7.1 | 100.0 | | | | |

=== June ===
June
- Strongest: 7.2 M_{w} 2 events
- Deadliest: 7.2 M_{w} Dutch East Indies; 101 deaths
- Total fatalities: 141

Number by magnitude
- 8.0–8.9: 0
- 7.0–7.9: 2
- 6.0–6.9: 3

| Date | Country and location | M_{w} | Depth (km) | MMI | Notes | Casualties | |
| Date | Country and location | M_{w} | Depth (km) | MMI | Notes | Dead | Injured |
|---|---|---|---|---|---|---|---|
| 3 | Dutch East Indies, central Sumatra | 7.2 | 0.0 | | The 1909 Kerinci earthquake killed least 101 people and many homes were destroyed or damaged. A tsunami was observed. Depth unknown. | 101 | |
| 8 | Chile, Atacama Region | 7.2 | 0.0 | | Depth unknown. | | |
| 11 | France, Vaucluse | 6.2 | 0.0 | X | This was the worst event in French history. 40 people died in the 1909 Provence earthquake. Some damage was caused. Depth unknown. | 40 | |
| 12 | New Hebrides | 6.9 | 0.0 | | Depth unknown. | | |
| 27 | British Solomon Islands | 6.8 | 0.0 | | Depth unknown. | | |

=== July ===
July
- Strongest: 7.7 M_{w} Afghanistan
- Deadliest: 0.0 M_{w} Pakistan; 10 deaths
- Total fatalities: 11

Number by magnitude
- 8.0–8.9: 0
- 7.0–7.9: 2
- 6.0–6.9: 2
- 5.0–5.9: 1

| Date | Country and location | M_{w} | Depth (km) | MMI | Notes | Casualties | |
| Date | Country and location | M_{w} | Depth (km) | MMI | Notes | Dead | Injured |
|---|---|---|---|---|---|---|---|
| 7 | Afghanistan, Nurestan Province | 7.7 | 200.0 | VII | | | |
| 8 | Pakistan, Khyber Pakhtunkhwa | 0.0 | 0.0 | | 10 people were killed and damage was reported. Magnitude and depth unknown. | 10 | |
| 13 | Russia, Sea of Okhotsk | 6.5 | 250.0 | | | | |
| 15 | Greece, West Greece | 5.7 | 4.0 | X | 1 person died. | 1 | |
| 30 | Mexico, off the coast of Guerrero | 7.5 | 20.0 | | Extensive damage was caused. | | |
| 31 | Mexico, off the coast of Guerrero | 6.9 | 0.0 | | Aftershock. Depth unknown. | | |

=== August ===
August
- Strongest: 7.2 M_{w} France
- Deadliest: 6.7 M_{w} Japan; 41 deaths
- Total fatalities: 41

Number by magnitude
- 8.0–8.9: 0
- 7.0–7.9: 1
- 6.0–6.9: 3

| Date | Country and location | M_{w} | Depth (km) | MMI | Notes | Casualties | |
| Date | Country and location | M_{w} | Depth (km) | MMI | Notes | Dead | Injured |
|---|---|---|---|---|---|---|---|
| 4 | China, eastern Xizang Province | 6.5 | 0.0 | | Depth unknown. | | |
| 14 | Japan, Shiga Prefecture, Japan | 6.7 | 5.0 | | Main article: 1909 Anegawa earthquake | 41 | |
| 16 | Costa Rica, San Jose, Costa Rica | 6.8 | 0.0 | | Depth unknown. | | |
| 18 | France, southeast of Loyalty Islands | 7.2 | 100.0 | | | | |

=== September ===
September
- Strongest: 7.0 M_{w} United States
- Total fatalities: 0

Number by magnitude
- 8.0–8.9: 0
- 7.0–7.9: 1
- 6.0–6.9: 2

| Date | Country and location | M_{w} | Depth (km) | MMI | Notes | Casualties | |
| Date | Country and location | M_{w} | Depth (km) | MMI | Notes | Dead | Injured |
|---|---|---|---|---|---|---|---|
| 8 | United States, Fox Islands (Alaska) | 7.0 | 90.0 | | | | |
| 10 | Japan, Ryukyu Islands | 6.6 | 100.0 | | | | |
| 16 | Japan, south of Hokkaido | 6.8 | 35.0 | | | | |

=== October ===
October
- Strongest: 7.0 M_{w} Pakistan
- Deadliest: 7.0 M_{w} Pakistan; 231 deaths
- Total fatalities: 231

Number by magnitude
- 8.0–8.9: 0
- 7.0–7.9: 1
- 6.0–6.9: 1
- 5.0–5.9: 1

| Date | Country and location | M_{w} | Depth (km) | MMI | Notes | Casualties | |
| Date | Country and location | M_{w} | Depth (km) | MMI | Notes | Dead | Injured |
|---|---|---|---|---|---|---|---|
| 20 | Pakistan, Sind Province | 7.0 | 35.0 | | 231 people were killed. Some damage was caused. | 231 | |
| 29 | Turkey, Bursa Province | 5.8 | 0.0 | VIII | Major damage was reported. Depth unknown. | | |
| 30 | Dutch East Indies, Tanimbar Islands | 6.7 | 250.0 | | | | |

=== November ===
November
- Strongest: 7.5 M_{w} Japan
- Deadliest: 7.1 M_{w} Taiwan; 4 deaths
- Total fatalities: 4

Number by magnitude
- 8.0–8.9: 0
- 7.0–7.9: 2
- 6.0–6.9: 0

| Date | Country and location | M_{w} | Depth (km) | MMI | Notes | Casualties | |
| Date | Country and location | M_{w} | Depth (km) | MMI | Notes | Dead | Injured |
|---|---|---|---|---|---|---|---|
| 10 | Japan, Miyazaki Prefecture, Honshu | 7.5 | 150.0 | | | | |
| 21 | Taiwan, north of | 7.1 | 5.0 | | 4 people were killed. 14 homes were destroyed. | 4 | |

=== December ===
December
- Strongest: 7.0 M_{w} British Solomon Islands
- Total fatalities: 0

Number by magnitude
- 8.0–8.9: 0
- 7.0–7.9: 1
- 6.0–6.9: 1

| Date | Country and location | M_{w} | Depth (km) | MMI | Notes | Casualties | |
| Date | Country and location | M_{w} | Depth (km) | MMI | Notes | Dead | Injured |
|---|---|---|---|---|---|---|---|
| 9 | British Solomon Islands | 7.0 | 0.0 | | Depth unknown. | | |
| 9 | Guam | 6.8 | 50.0 | VIII | Some damage was caused. | | |
