= Vernègues =

Commune in Provence-Alpes-Côte d'Azur, France

- Commune
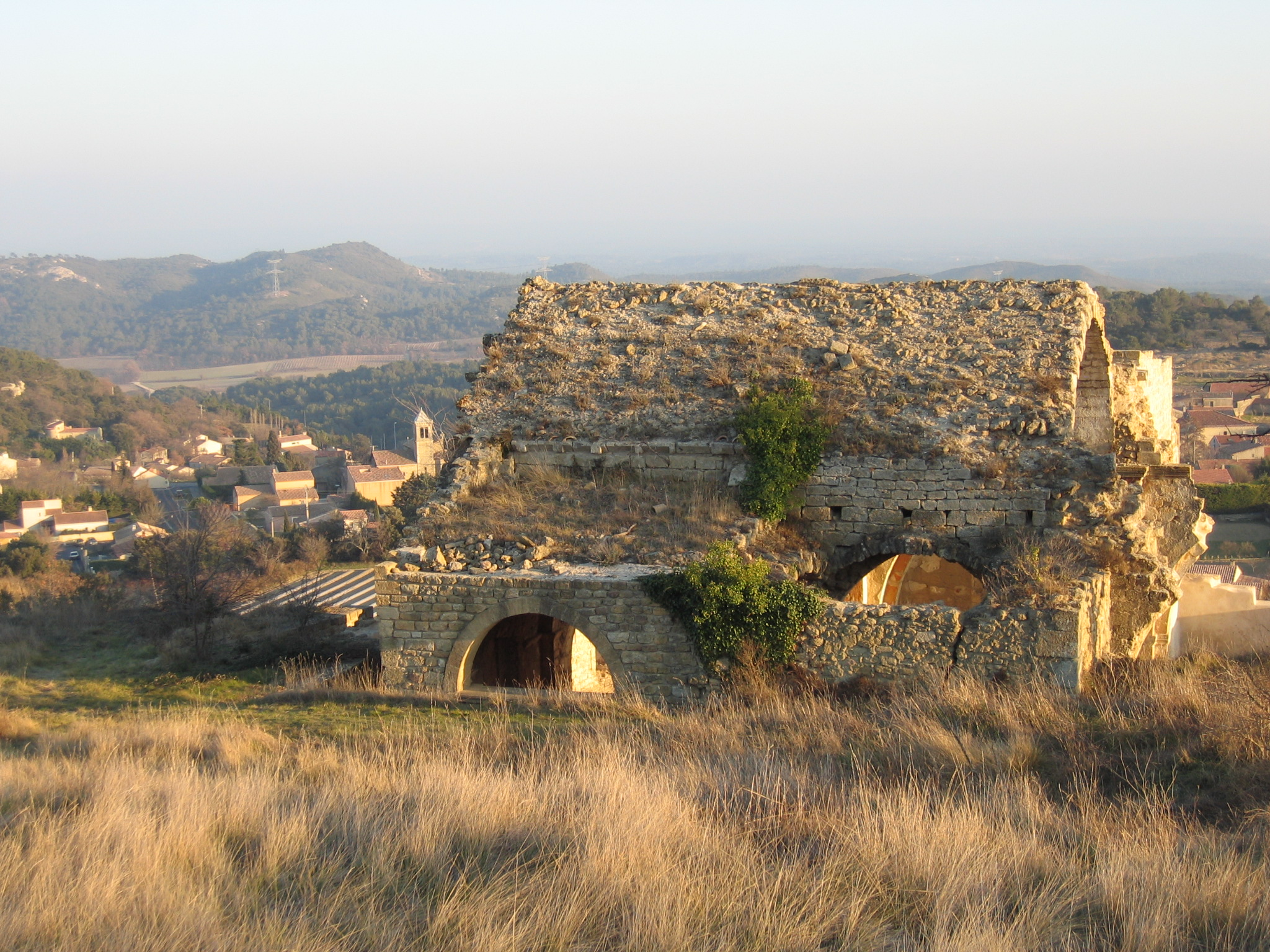
- Former Saint-Jacques church

- Coat of arms
- Location of Vernègues
- Location within France Location within Provence-Alpes-Côte d'Azur
- Coordinates: 43°41′10″N 5°10′19″E
- Country: France
- Region: Provence-Alpes-Côte d'Azur
- Department: Bouches-du-Rhône
- Arrondissement: Aix-en-Provence
- Canton: Pélissanne
- Intercommunality: Aix-Marseille-Provence

Government
  - Mayor (2026–32): Anne Reybaud-Decroix
- Area^{1}: 15.89 km^{2} (6.14 sq mi)
- Elevation: 352 m (1,155 ft)
- Highest elevation: 395 m (1,296 ft)
- Lowest elevation: 163 m (535 ft)
- Population (2023): 2,166
  - Density: 136.3/km^{2} (353.0/sq mi)
- Time zone: UTC+01:00 (CET)
  - Summer (DST): UTC+02:00 (CEST)
- INSEE/Postal code: 13115 /13116
- ^{1} French Land Register data, which excludes lakes, ponds, glaciers > 1 km^{2} (0.386 sq mi or 247 acres) and river estuaries.

Vernègues (French pronunciation: [vɛʁnɛg]; Occitan: Lo Vernegue) is a commune in the Bouches-du-Rhône département in southern France.

The commune is made up of two villages: Vernègues and Cazan.

On 11 June 1909 an earthquake killed two villagers and destroyed the castle in Vernègues and most of the houses. The village was later rebuilt at a lower altitude.

== Population ==
Historical population

Year	Pop.	±% p.a.
1793	494	—
1800	465	−0.86%
1806	490	+0.88%
1821	506	+0.21%
1831	515	+0.18%
1836	472	−1.73%
1841	478	+0.25%
1846	524	+1.85%
1851	542	+0.68%
1856	525	−0.64%
1861	561	+1.34%
1866	476	−3.23%
1872	455	−0.75%
1876	432	−1.29%
1881	381	−2.48%
1886	336	−2.48%
1891	368	+1.84%
1896	338	−1.69%
1901	302	−2.23%

Year	Pop.	±% p.a.
1906	298	−0.27%
1911	337	+2.49%
1921	253	−2.83%
1926	235	−1.47%
1931	222	−1.13%
1936	234	+1.06%
1946	219	−0.66%
1954	220	+0.06%
1962	243	+1.25%
1968	259	+1.07%
1975	285	+1.38%
1982	377	+4.08%
1990	687	+7.79%
1999	939	+3.53%
2007	1,344	+4.58%
2012	1,524	+2.55%
2017	1,845	+3.90%
2023	2,166	+2.71%

Source: EHESS and INSEE (1968-2023)

== See also ==
- Communes of the Bouches-du-Rhône department
