= 1909 Provence earthquake =

- Location within France
- UTC time: 1909-06-11 21:06:00
- ISC event
- USGS-ANSS: ComCat
- Local date: 11 June 1909
- Local time: 21:15
- Magnitude: 6.2 M_{s} 6.0 M_{w} 5.5 M_{I}
- Epicenter: 43.7°N 5.4°E
- Areas affected: France, Provence
- Max. intensity: MMI X (Extreme)
- Casualties: 46 dead

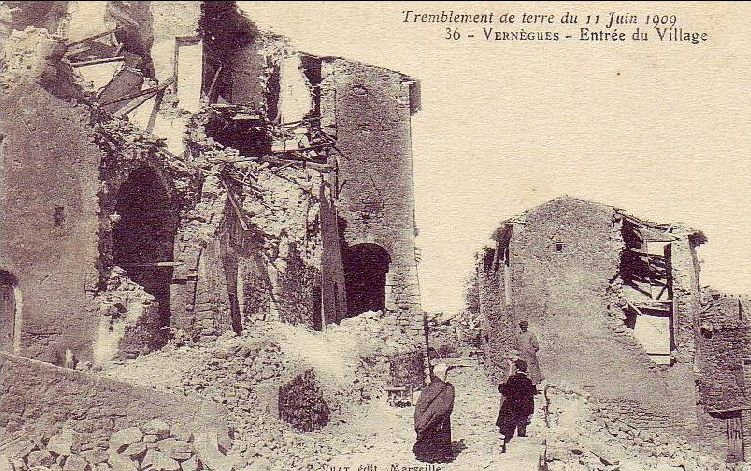
Vernègues after the earthquake

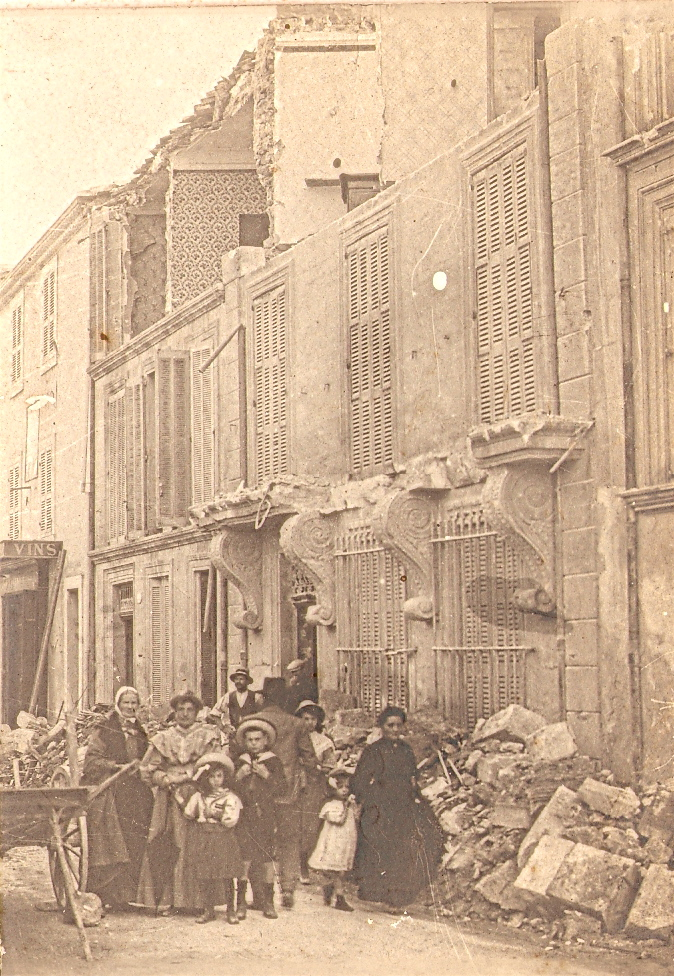
Street in Salon-de-Provence after the earthquake

The 1909 Provence earthquake occurred on June 11 in Provence. Measuring 6.2 on the surface-wave magnitude scale, it is the largest ever recorded earthquake in metropolitan France.

== Description ==
A total of 46 people died, another 250 were injured, and approximately 2,000 buildings were damaged.

The most damaged communes were Salon-de-Provence, Vernègues, Lambesc, Saint-Cannat and Rognes.

Fourteen people died in Rognes, which was half destroyed, especially the houses on the flanks of the hill Le Foussa. People were relocated under tents on another hill (Le Devin) and near the primary school. The main shock occurred at 9:15pm. If the earthquake had happened an hour later, more people would have been in bed, and more casualties would have been recorded.

The Vernègues castle and most of the houses in Vernègues were destroyed. Two people died in the village, which was later rebuilt at a lower altitude.

== See also ==
- List of earthquakes in 1909
- List of earthquakes in France
- 1909 Benavente earthquake
