= Beaumont-du-Ventoux =

Beaumont-du-Ventoux Bèumont dau Ventor (Occitan)
- Commune
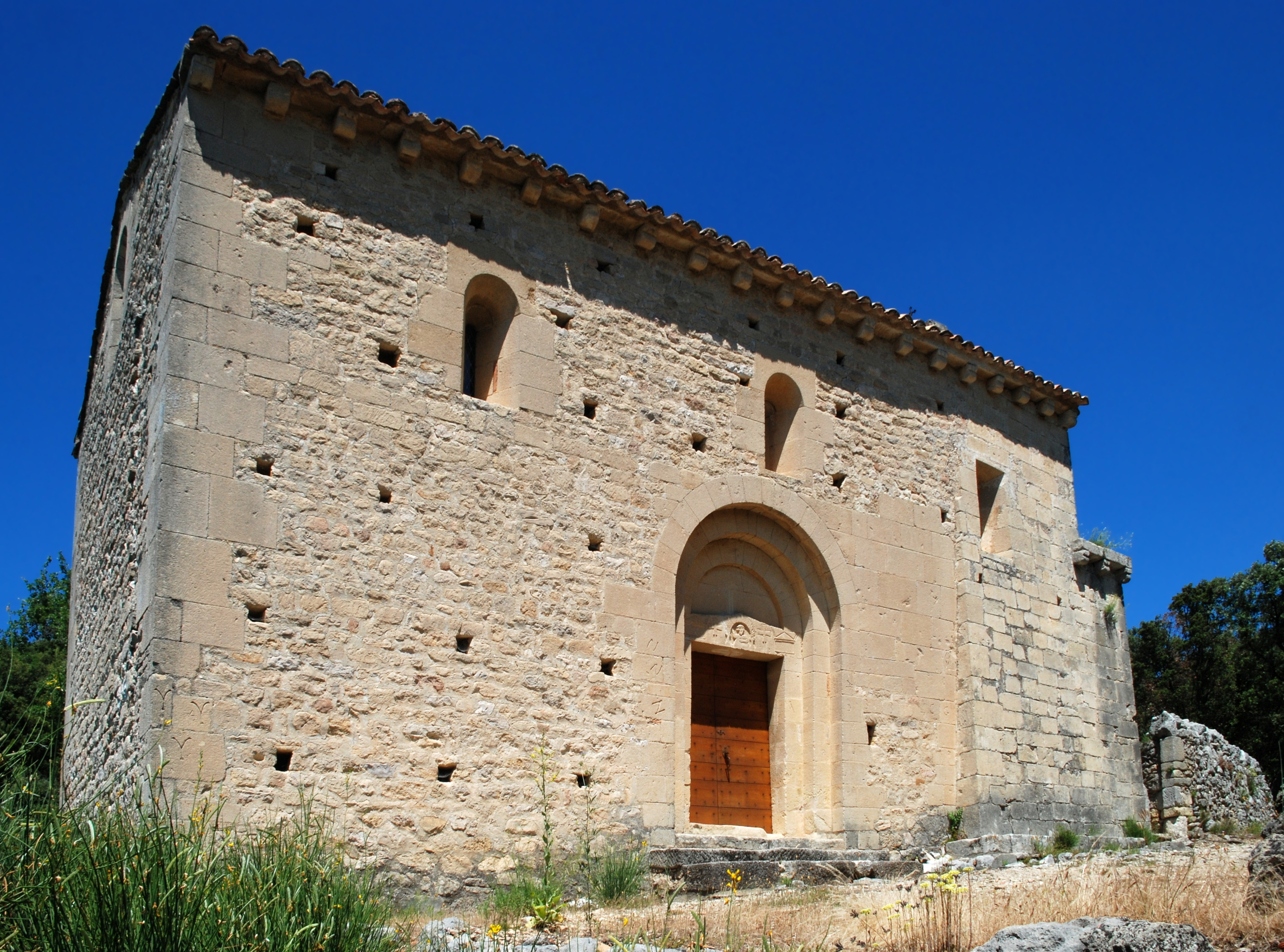
- The Chapel of the Holy Sepulchre (French: Chapelle du Saint-Sépulcre) in Beaumont-du-Ventoux

- Coat of arms
- Location of Beaumont-du-Ventoux
- Location within France Location within Provence-Alpes-Côte d'Azur
- Coordinates: 44°11′01″N 5°09′59″E
- Country: France
- Region: Provence-Alpes-Côte d'Azur
- Department: Vaucluse
- Arrondissement: Carpentras
- Canton: Vaison-la-Romaine
- Intercommunality: CA Ventoux-Comtat Venaissin

Government
  - Mayor (2020–2026): Alain Bremond
- Area^{1}: 28.16 km^{2} (10.87 sq mi)
- Elevation: 425 m (1,394 ft)
- Highest elevation: 1,900 m (6,200 ft)
- Lowest elevation: 357 m (1,171 ft)
- Population (2023): 308
  - Density: 10.9/km^{2} (28.3/sq mi)
- Time zone: UTC+01:00 (CET)
  - Summer (DST): UTC+02:00 (CEST)
- INSEE/Postal code: 84015 /84340
- ^{1} French Land Register data, which excludes lakes, ponds, glaciers > 1 km^{2} (0.386 sq mi or 247 acres) and river estuaries.

Beaumont-du-Ventoux (French pronunciation: [bomɔ̃ dy vɑ̃tu]; Occitan: Bèumont dau Ventor) is a rural commune in the Vaucluse department in the Provence-Alpes-Côte d'Azur region in Southeastern France. As of 2023, the population of the commune was 308.

The commune wine co-operative "cave" draws on local vineyards. The overall area is at the foothill of the famous Mont Ventoux, a renowned cycle stage of the Tour de France.

== Monuments and sights ==
- Château de Beaumont le Vieux, ruined 10th century castle

== See also ==
- Communes of the Vaucluse department
