= Château de Crestet =

Castle in Provence-Alpes-Côte d'Azur, France

Coordinates: 44.2171°N 5.0839°E

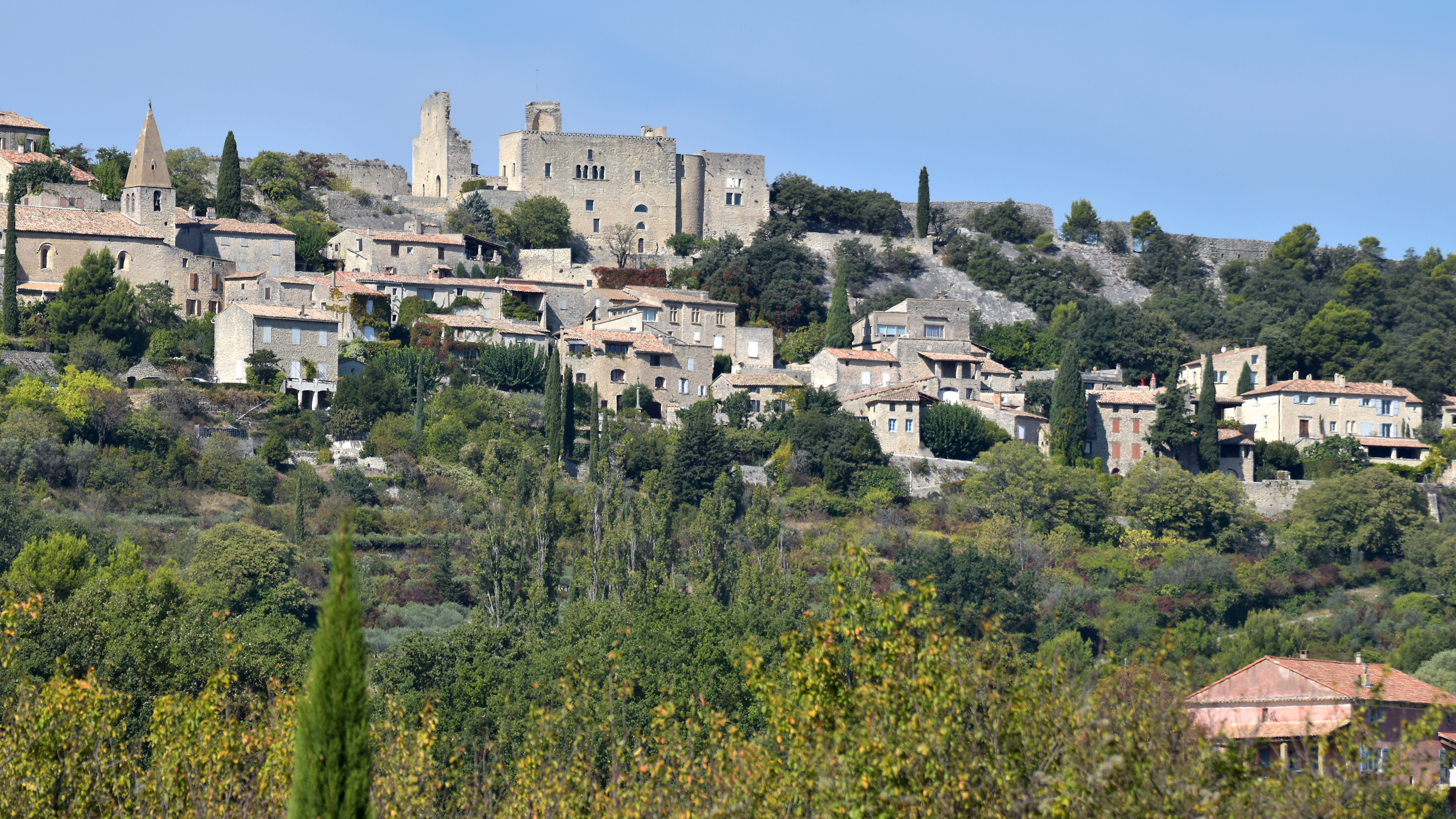
View of the castle

The Château de Crestet is a castle in the commune of Crestet in the Vaucluse département of France.

== History ==
Construction began between 840 and 850. It was a summer residence of the Bishops of Vaison-la-Romaine. In 1160, Raymond VI, Count of Toulouse, seized the castle at Vaison and drove out the bishops who came to the castle at Crestet. In 1189, Raymond VI also seized Crestet.

During the 14th century, the castle was remodelled as evidence of Gothic architecture are still visible. During the French Revolution, the castle was sacked and much of its furniture burned. Abandoned, the castle was used as a quarry by local people. During World War II, (at the end of 1943, beginning of 1944), a German unit of about twenty men occupied the castle and surrounded it with barbed wire. They slept in houses in the village.

== Restoration ==
In 1979, the noted French architect, Roger Anger (1923 – 2008), designer of the city of Auroville in India acquired the castle and in 1985 undertook its consolidation and restoration on which he worked until his death.

== See also ==
- List of castles in France
