= Igreja da Misericórdia (Braga) =

Church in Sé, Braga, Portugal

Coordinates: 41.5504°N 8.42696°W

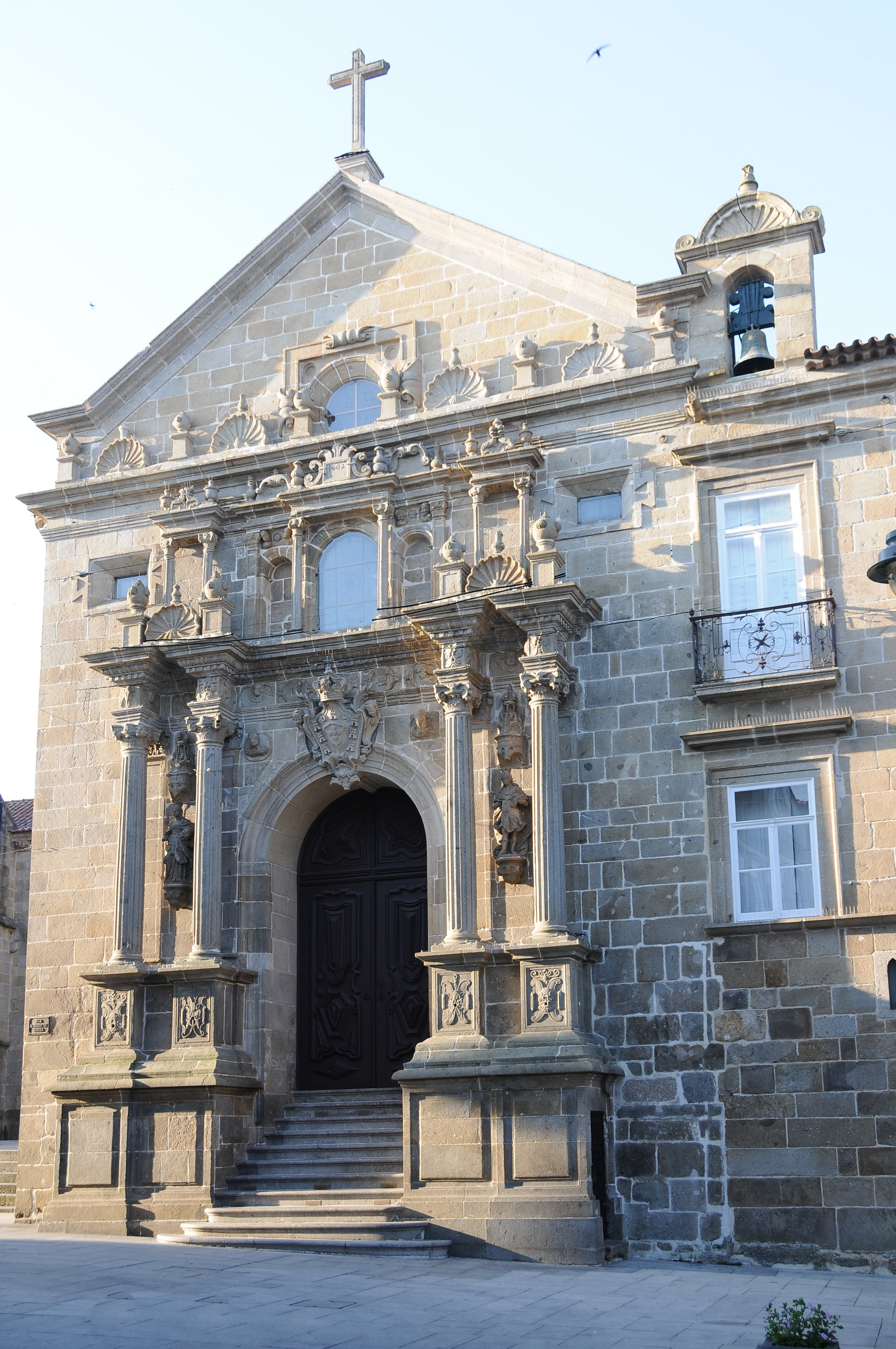
Misericórdia Church

The Misericórdia is a church located in Sé, Braga, Portugal.

Built in 1562 it is considered the most important legacy of the Renaissance period in the city, despite the profound changes it suffered in the 18th and 19th centuries.

It was redesigned by architect Nicolau Nasoni from 1749 to 1753.

== Gallery ==
Main façade and entrance

Side portal with the Visitation sculpture group above the doorway

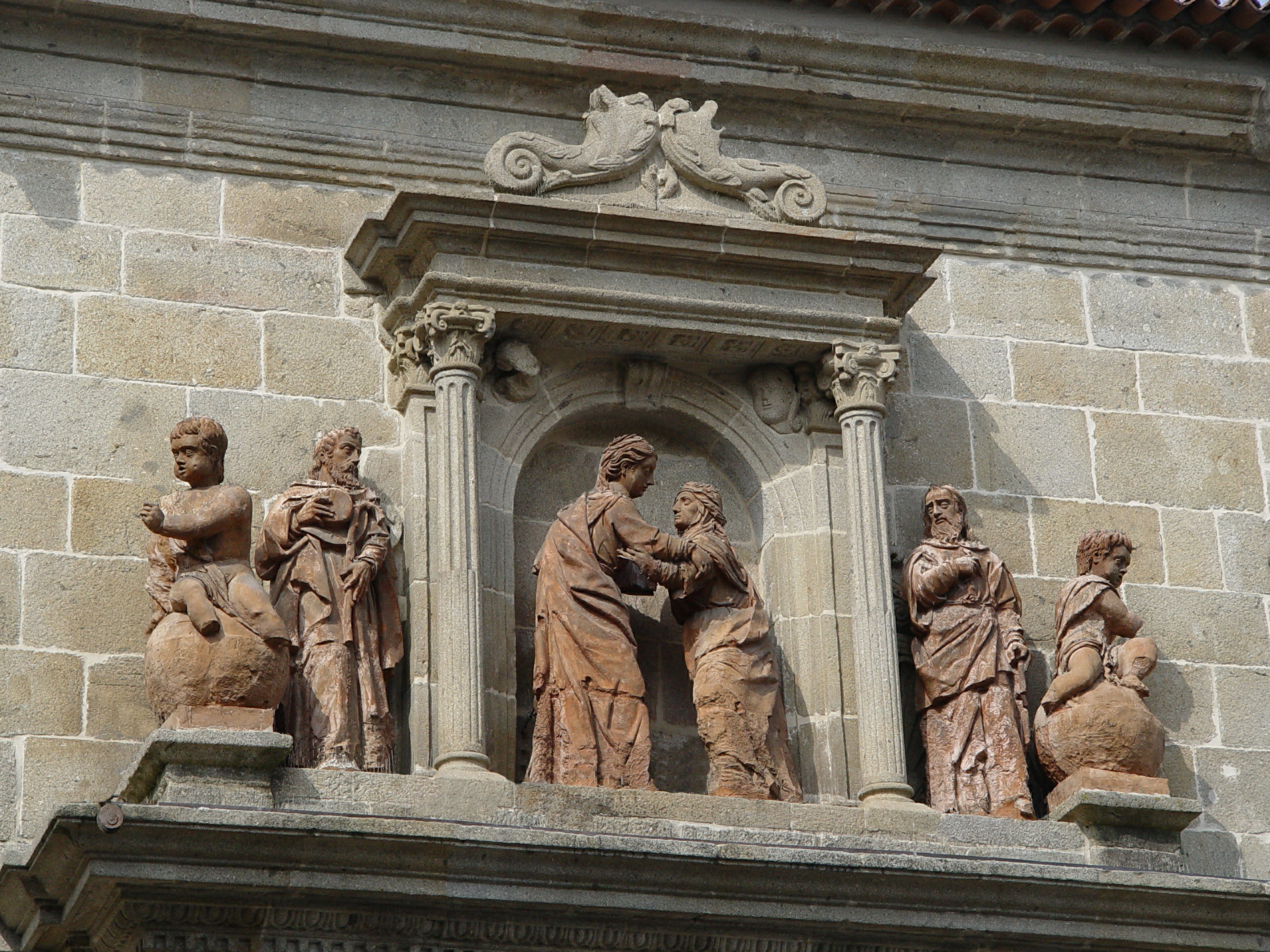
Detail of the Visitation sculpture group

Gilded high altar and coffered ceiling
