= 1909 Anegawa earthquake =

Earthquake in Japan

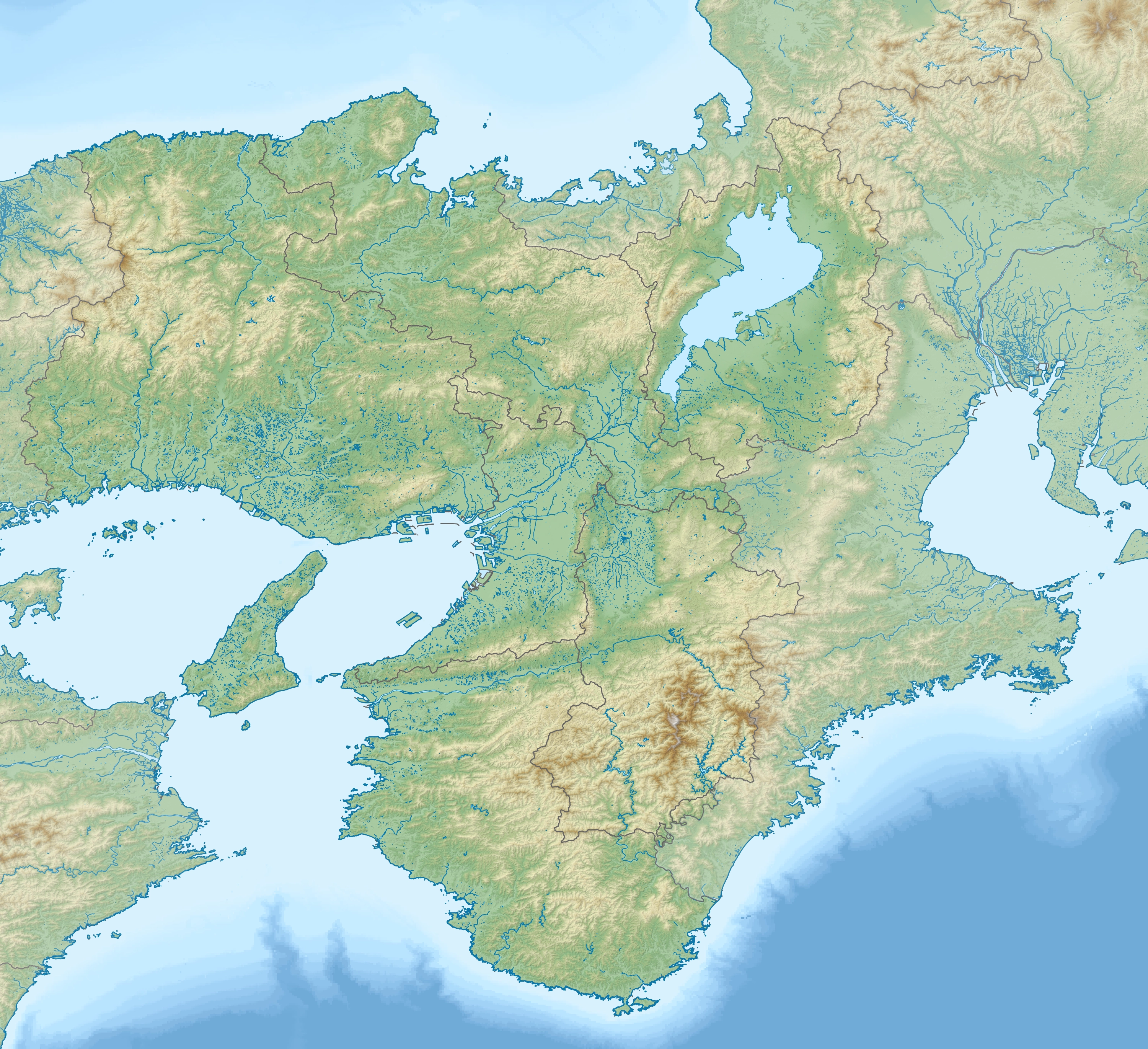
- Location within Kansai region
- UTC time: 1909-08-14 06:30:54
- ISC event
- USGS-ANSS: ComCat
- Local date: August 14, 1909
- Local time: 15:30
- Magnitude: 6.9 M_{w}
- Depth: 15 km (9.3 mi)
- Epicenter: 35.773°N 136.557°E
- Areas affected: Japan
- Max. intensity: JMA 6
- Tsunami: 1.8 m (5 ft 11 in) at Lake Biwa
- Casualties: 41 fatalities, 784 injuries

The 1909 Anegawa earthquake affected Shiga and Gifu prefectures in Japan on August 14. The epicenter of the M_{w} 6.9 earthquake was located in Gifu Prefecture and its focal depth was estimated at 15 km (9.3 mi). There were at least 41 fatalities and over 1,000 homes destroyed. A 1.8 m (5.9 ft) high tsunami was also recorded in Lake Biwa.

== Earthquake ==
The earthquake may have occurred on the Tsurugawan-Isewan Tectonic Line, a major fault trending generally northwest–southeast in central Japan. The fault zone comprises five active fault segments that trend northwest–southeast and west-northwest–east-southeast. Its northern strand, the Kaburagi Fault, runs along the edge of Tsuruga Bay and joins the Yanagase Fault to its south. A bend towards the east–southeast separates the fault from the Sekigahara Fault. The earthquake likely ruptured the central portion of the Sekigahara Fault. A possible precursor event sequence may have begun ten years before the mainshock as "notable earthquakes" occurred along an area between Tsuruga Bay and Ise Bay. The damage area from the earthquake was considered smaller than expected for its magnitude. The fault zone also contains two additional segments; the Yoro and Isewan faults; the latter is considered a branch of the Japan Median Tectonic Line. The Sekigahara Fault produces reverse and left-lateral strike-slip movement.

== Impact ==
Forty-one people died and at least 784 were injured. In addition to 1,100 destroyed houses, many temples were razed. An additional 1,000 homes were also damaged. The slope of Mount Ibuki collapsed which was accompanied by a "thunderous roar." Fifty homes on Lake Biwa were totally razed and 20 others were destroyed. A toppling cliffside at a Gifu marble quarry left one dead and five wounded. Thirty people died in Higashiazai District; the worst affected district. Fifteen worship monuments and places were also totally ruined. At least 431 homes and 636 buildings completely collapsed. The maximum JMA seismic intensity (Shindo) was 6 in present-day Nagahama. Shindo 4–5 was also observed throughout Shiga Prefecture.

== See also ==
- List of earthquakes in 1909
- List of earthquakes in Japan
