= Château de Vernègues =

Castle in Provence-Alpes-Côte d'Azur, France

Coordinates: 43.6902°N 5.1674°E

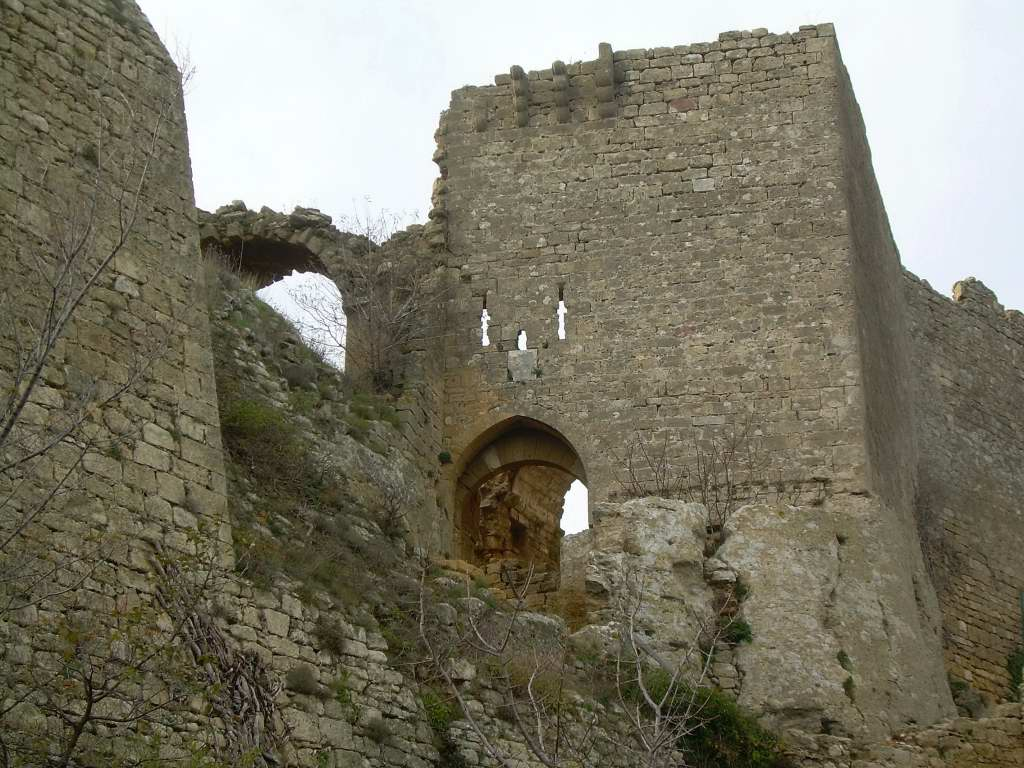
Château de Vernègues

The Château de Vernègues is a ruined castle in the commune of Vernègues in the Bouches-du-Rhône département of France.

== History ==
The village of Vernègues developed in the 8th century when, according to ancient maps, there were two hill top fortifications, the "Castrum de Avallone" and the "Castrum Alvernicum". The latter, constructed on a rocky escarpment, became Vernègues and its medieval castle. On the evening of 11 June 1909, the Lambesc earthquake (magnitude 6 on the Richter scale) shook the region and destroyed practically all of the castle and the old village that had developed around it. Today, ruins on the south flank of the plateau are witness to the severity of the earthquake.

The castle is the property of the commune. It has been listed since 1934 as a monument historique by the French Ministry of Culture.

== See also ==
- List of castles in France
