= Château de Beaumont le Vieux =

Castle in Provence-Alpes-Côte d'Azur, France

Coordinates: 44°10′49.5″N 5°10′49.5″E

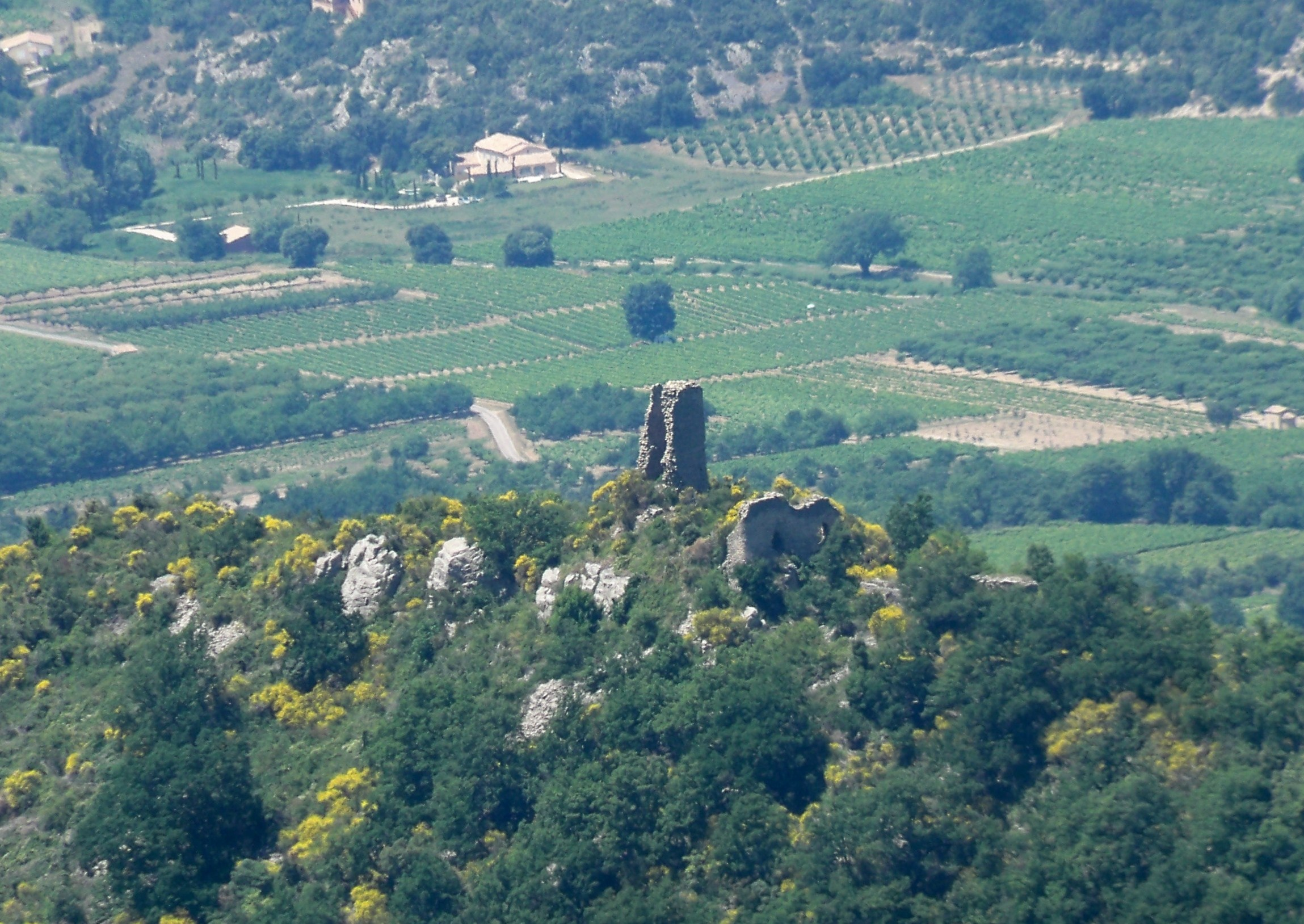
Ruins of Beaumont le Vieux

The Château de Beaumont le Vieux is a ruined castle in the commune of Beaumont-du-Ventoux in the Vaucluse département of France.

The castle was built towards the end of the 10th century under the reign of the Counts of Toulouse. It was probably destroyed during the Wars of Religion in the 16th century. All that remains is a ruined tower.

== See also ==
- List of castles in France
