= Château de Lucéram =

French castle

Coordinates: 43°53′00″N 7°21′41″E

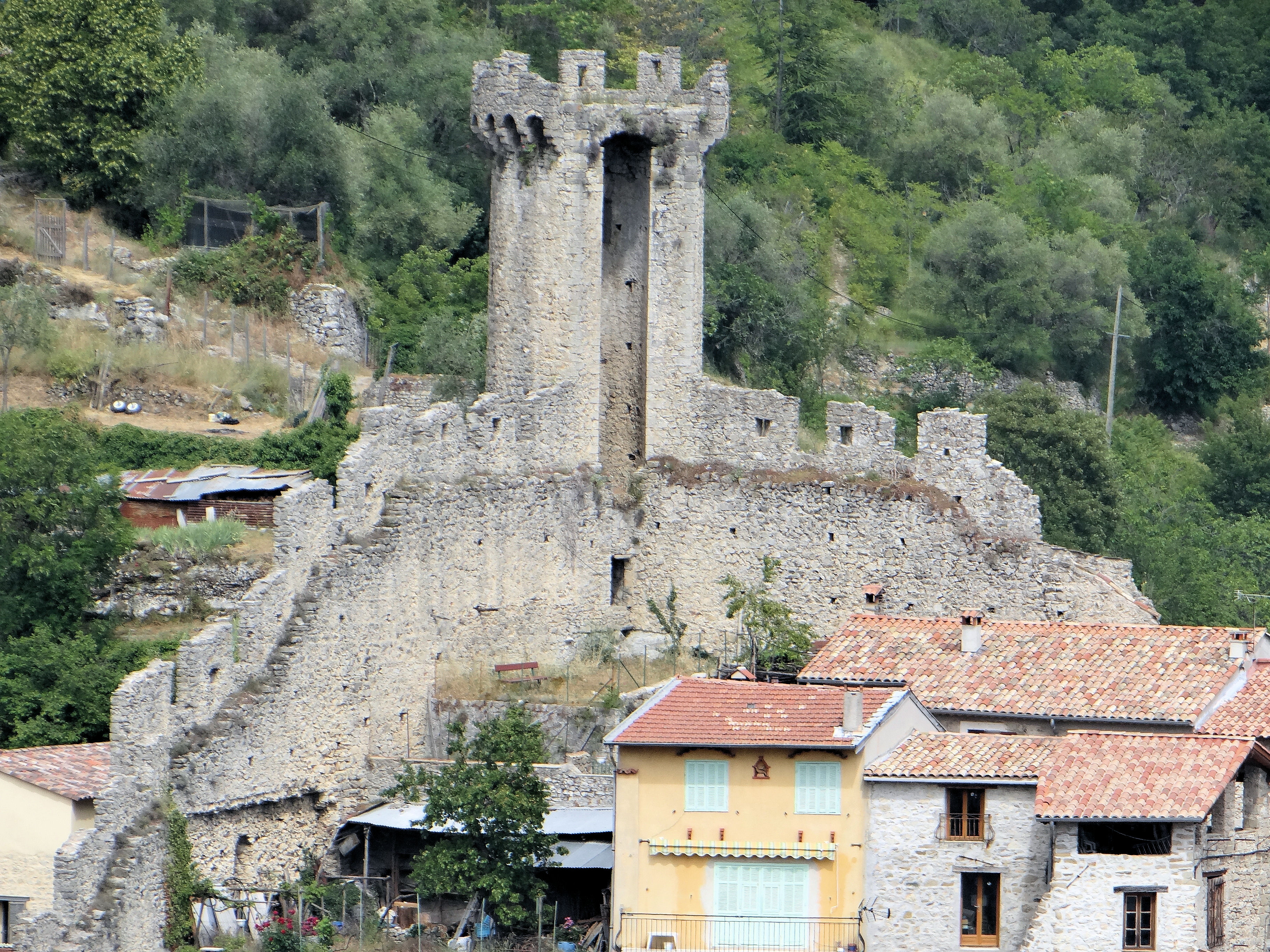
The ruins of Lucéram castle, Tower and surrounding wall to the north-east

The Château de Lucéram is a ruined castle, dating from the 12th and 13th centuries, in the commune of Lucéram in the Alpes-Maritimes département of France. The castle is the property of the commune. It has been listed since 1927 as a monument historique by the French Ministry of Culture.

== Description ==
The keep is open on the side facing the village. Two intermediate wooden floors allowed access by ladders to the top level. The tower served as a watch point for the surrounding area. Machicolations on the top allowed defenders to drop projectiles onto assailants. The ramparts stretch out north and south of the tower. The wall is well-reserved for 40 metres; numerous houses have been built into it. The round walk is on the ramparts; it is still possible to make out the extent of the round walk around the enceinte. Guards would have been able to see the entire surroundings and were protected by crenellations.

== See also ==
- List of castles in France
