= Egger (surname) =

Egger is a German surname. Notable people with the surname include:

- Albin Egger-Lienz (1868–1926), Austrian painter
- Émile Egger (1813–1885), French philologist
- Esther Egger-Wyss (born 1952), Swiss politician
- Hélène Egger (1929–2024), Dutch Holocaust survivor
- Hubert Egger (1927–2014), West German cross country skier
- Jean-Pierre Egger (1943–2025), Swiss shot putter
- Johann Egger (1804–1866), Austrian entomologist
- Jolanda Egger (born 1960), Swiss model and actress
- Joseph Egger (1889–1966), Austrian actor
- Juerg Egger (born 1982), Swiss bobsledder
- Markus Egger (born 1975), Swiss beach volleyball player
- Markus Egger (footballer) (born 1990), Austrian footballer
- Regula Egger (born 1958), Swiss Olympic javelin thrower
- Reinhard Egger (Luftwaffe) (1905–1987), German paratrooper
- Reinhard Egger (born 1989), Austrian luger
- René Egger (1916–2016), French architect
- Roscoe L. Egger Jr. (1920–1999), American IRS commissioner
- Stephanie Egger (born 1988), Swiss mixed martial artist
- Toni Egger (1926-1959) Austrian rock-climber and mountaineer
- Urs Egger (1953–2020), Swiss actor and director
- Waltraud Egger (born 1950), Italian athlete
- Wolfgang Egger (born 1963), German car designer

== See also ==
- Egger (disambiguation)
- Eggers (surname)
- Eggar (disambiguation)
- Ecker
