= École nationale supérieure d'architecture de Marseille-Luminy =

Architecture school in Marseille, France

- ensa•marseille
- Type: Public
- Established: 1967–1969
- Academic affiliations: University of Aix-Marseille
- Chancellor: Hélène Corset-Maillard
- Students: 1000
- Location: Marseille, France; 43.2291°N 5.4340°E
- Website: www.marseille.archi.fr

The École nationale supérieure d'architecture de Marseille-Luminy is a French school of architecture.

== Diploma ==
The school delivers the following diplomas in architecture :

- Bachelor's degree
- Master's degree

== History ==
In 1752, the Marseille academic school of drawing is established by painters Michel-François Dandré-Bardon and Jean-Joseph Kapeller in the premises of the arsenal which later moved to the Canebière.

In 1780, the school became the academy of painting, sculpture, and civil and naval architecture

In 1796, the school moved to the Convent of the Bernardines of Marseille under the name of 'free school of drawing.'

In 1812, a section of architecture was created, a subject mainly taught at the École Polytechnique (France) with a strong civil engineering component.

In 1862, this drawing school became the Marseille School of Fine Arts, which also taught architecture, construction, and perspective.

In 1874, the school of fine arts integrated the new Palais des Arts designed by Henri-Jacques Espérandieu, place Auguste et François Carli.

In 1882, opening of a drawing class for young girls "class of the damsels".

In 1905, the regional school of architecture of Marseille within the school of fine arts was created by a decree. This education allowed students to acquire the basics before entering the École Nationale supérieure des beaux-arts in Paris, which was the only one authorized to issue the architect's diploma at the time.

In 1967, the school of fine arts and architecture moved from the Place Carli, in the center of Marseille, to Luminy. Its new premises were designed by the architect René Egger under the impulse of Gaston Defferre and François Bret, its director since 1961.

In 1968, the school opened.
