= Egger =

Egger may mean:

- Egger Island, an island in Greenland
- Egger-bahn; model railway manufacturer
- Easter egger
- Egger (company); wood based panel manufacturer
- Egger (surname)
- Egger (band), was active in 2005

== See also ==
- Ecker
- Eggers (surname), a surname
- Eggar (disambiguation)
