= Eggar =

Eggar may refer to:

- Lasiocampidae, the eggar moths

== People ==
- Dave Eggar (born 1977), US musician
- John Eggar (1916–1983), English cricketer
- Katharine Emily Eggar (1874–1961), UK musician
- Samantha Eggar (1931–2025), British-American actress
- Tim Eggar (born 1951), UK politician

== Other uses ==
- Eggar's School, secondary school in Alton, Hampshire, England, UK

== See also ==
- Eggers (surname)
- Egger (surname)
- Egger (disambiguation)
