= Charlotte Malterre-Barthes =

French architect

- Born: 1977 (age 48–49); Marseille, France

Academic background
- Education: B.A., École nationale supérieure d'architecture de Marseille-Luminy; M.A., École nationale supérieure d'architecture de Marseille-Luminy; Ph.D.ETHZ
- Website: charlottemalterrebarthes.com

Charlotte Malterre-Barthes (born 1977) is a French architect and urban designer. She was an assistant professor at Harvard University Graduate School of Design until 2022, and is since assistant professor at École Polytechnique Fédérale de Lausanne.

== Early life and education ==
Malterre-Barthes attended École nationale supérieure d'architecture de Marseille-Luminy and ETHZ, where she received her Ph.D. on the political economy of commodities, nominated for the silver medal. She worked for architecture firms Coop Himmelblau, Rudy Ricciotti and B. V. Doshi.

== Career ==
After graduating, Malterre worked in several offices before opening her own urban design agency in Zurich with Noboru Kawagishi called OMNIBUS. In 2011, she joined the ETHZ as a research assistant and became the director of the MAS program in Urban Design. She was a research fellow at the Future Cities Laboratory at NUS in 2012.

As a faculty member at ETHZ, Malterre was a founding member of the Parity Group, an activist association dedicated to equity in architecture. In 2019, Malterre was appointed co-curator of the International Architecture Biennale of São Paulo. In 2020, Malterre joined the faculty at Harvard University Graduate School of Design as an assistant professor. During this time and together with office B+, she initiated the call for "A Global Moratorium on New Construction". This was also published, as an online graphic novel with Zosia Dzierżawska in the Architectural Review. and in 2025 as a book.

== Books ==
- Eileen Gray: A House Under the Sun. London: Nobrow, 2019. ISBN 9781910620434. With Zosia Dzierżawska.
- Some Haunted Spaces in Singapore. Zurich: Editions Patrick Frey, 2018. with M. Jaeggi.
- Cairo Desert Cities. Berlin: Ruby Press, 2017 ISBN 9783944074238 with M. Angelil
- Housing Cairo – The Informal Response. Berlin: Ruby Press, 2016 ISBN 9783944074177 with M. Angelil
- Migrant Marseille: Architecture of Social Segregation and Urban Inclusivity. Berlin: Ruby Press, 2020, ISBN 9783944074337 with M. Angelil
- A Moratorium on New Construction. London: Sternberg Press, 2025 ISBN 9781915609007
