= Church of the Mission of France =

Historic church in Marseille, France

Église de la Mission de France
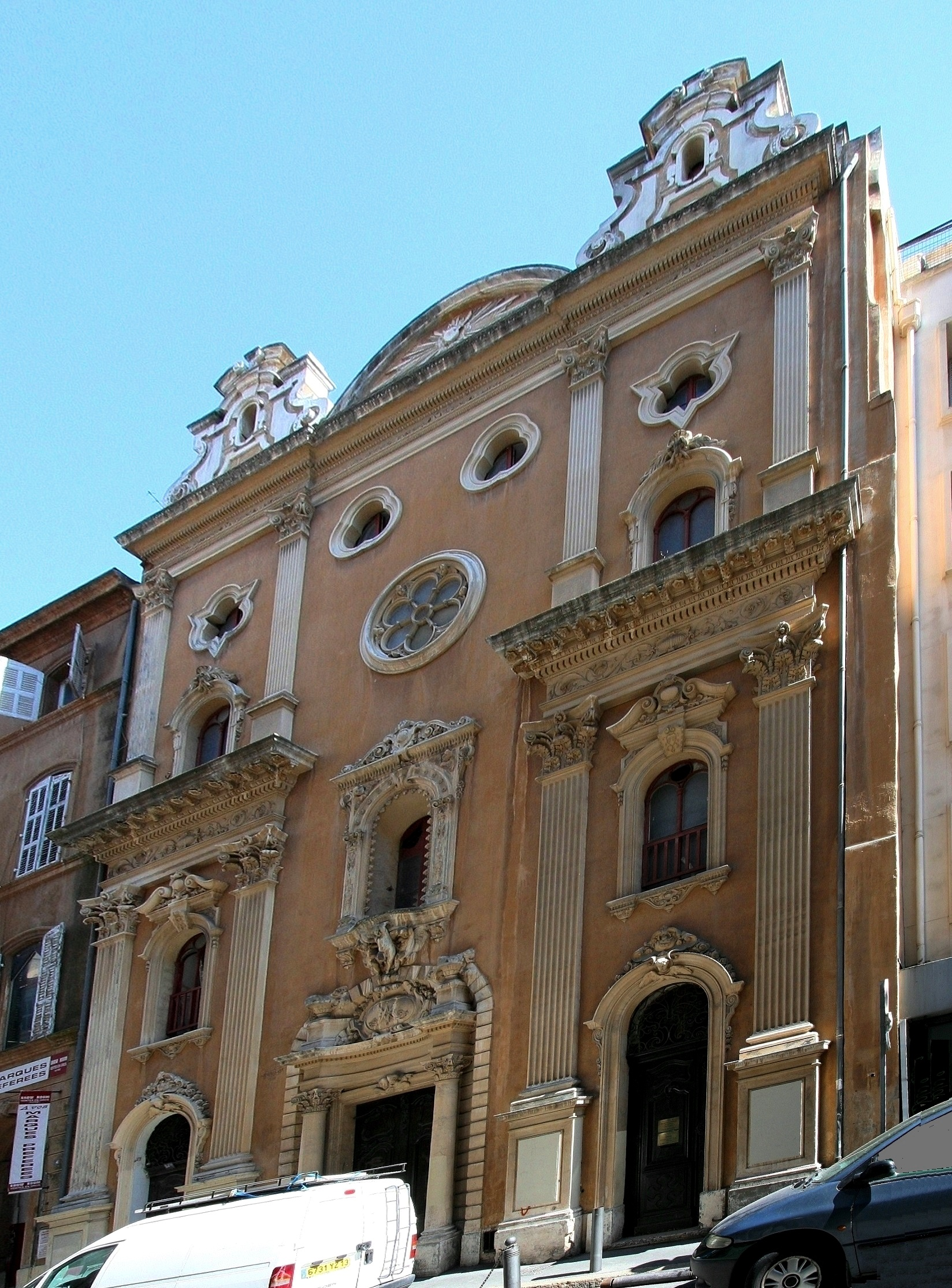
- Église de la Mission de France
- Interactive map of Église de la Mission de France
- Location: 44 Rue du Tapis-Vert, 1st arrondissement of Marseille, Marseille, Provence-Alpes-Côte d'Azur, France
- Coordinates: 43.2975°N 5.3778°E
- Designer: Henry Condamin (organ case)
- Type: Church
- Beginning date: 1648
- Completion date: 1673
- Dedicated to: Pope Pius X

The Church of the Mission of France is a historic church constructed in the late 17th century and extensively renovated in the 19th century. Located at 44 Rue du Tapis-Vert in the 1st arrondissement of Marseille, Marseille, France, it has been designated a historic monument since 8 December 1965.

== History ==
The Priests of the Mission of France, a religious congregation founded in the 17th century by Saint Vincent de Paul, established a modest presence in Marseille’s galley arsenal district. Known today as the Lazarists, the congregation built the church and adjacent buildings between 1648 and 1673 on a site bordered by the streets Tapis-Vert, Rue Thubaneau, Mission de France, and Longue-des-Capucins. This construction occurred during the city’s expansion under Louis XIV, overseen by Nicolas Arnoul, who directed the building of new fortifications.

During the French Revolution, the Mission’s properties were nationalized as biens nationaux. From 1791 to 1794, the church served as the first official Protestant temple in Marseille, leased by the Reformed Church of France following the 1787 Edict of Tolerance. In 1795, the convent buildings were sold, but the church was retained.

=== Jesuit period ===
In 1839, two years after assuming the episcopal see of Marseille, Bishop Eugène de Mazenod invited the Jesuits to return to his diocese and entrusted them with the church. Between 1841 and 1865, the Jesuits extensively rebuilt the church, connecting its entrance to Rue du Tapis-Vert. In 1860, cement worker Désiré Michel designed the church’s distinctive façade, which remains today. The high altar was consecrated in September 1864 by Bishop Petagna of Castellammare, and in 1865, the Puget firm from Toulouse installed an organ, with its case designed by Marseille architect and engineer Henry Condamin.

On 21 January 1861, Jean-François-Régis Barthès, S.J., founder of the Sisters of Our Lady of Compassion, died in one of the Jesuit residence’s rooms. (Note: Régis Deretz, archivist of the Sisters of Our Lady of Compassion.)

=== 20th century: deconsecration ===
Following the anti-congregation laws of the French Third Republic, the Jesuits were expelled in 1901, and the church, now municipal property, was closed to worship. It served variously as a concert hall, a masonry school, and a storage facility for school supplies until 1979.

=== Return to worship ===
In 1984, the City of Marseille returned the church to religious use, entrusting it to the Priestly Fraternity of Saint Pius X, which dedicated it to Pope Pius X.

== Organ ==
In 1933, under Marcel Prévot’s initiative, the organ’s case was moved to the chapel of the grand seminary. The original Puget pipework had been lost, and an electric-transmission organ from the Rialto cinema was installed. In 1989, the parish received pipework from an organ in Tours, and in 1990, the City of Marseille restored the organ to its original case in the church. A 17-stop instrument was reassembled in the gallery and played for the first time at the Christmas 1991 midnight mass. Odile Pierre inaugurated the organ the Sunday before Ascension Thursday, and Bishop Tissier de Mallerais of the Saint Pius X Fraternity blessed it. The parish launched Marseille’s first sacred music festival, “Médiévances,” featuring musicians performing works from Claudio Monteverdi to Naji Hakim. The festival ran for two years.

In 2006, the parish acquired a Baroque-style organ from Germany, adapted by organ builder Yves Cabourdin in Carces, Var. The mechanical action was rebuilt, and the organ was revoiced. Modifications included adding two chamade trumpet stops (electric action due to space constraints), replacing the gamba with a new cromorne, substituting the shifted oboe with a voix humaine at the pedal, and recomposing the mixture to six fixed ranks. These changes enabled performance of 17th- and 18th-century German and French repertoires. Thierry Boccamaïello has been the organist since 1991.

== Furnishings ==
The 1864 high altar was lost and replaced with an altar from a side chapel of the former Saint-Martin Church, in Marseille, demolished in 1887 during the creation of Rue Colbert.

In August 2020, a fir pulpit from the convent of the Sisters Victims of the Sacred Heart of Jesus, formerly at 52 Rue Levat in La Belle de Mai, was installed. That same year, a painting of the Baptism of Christ was placed behind the baptistery.

== Gallery ==
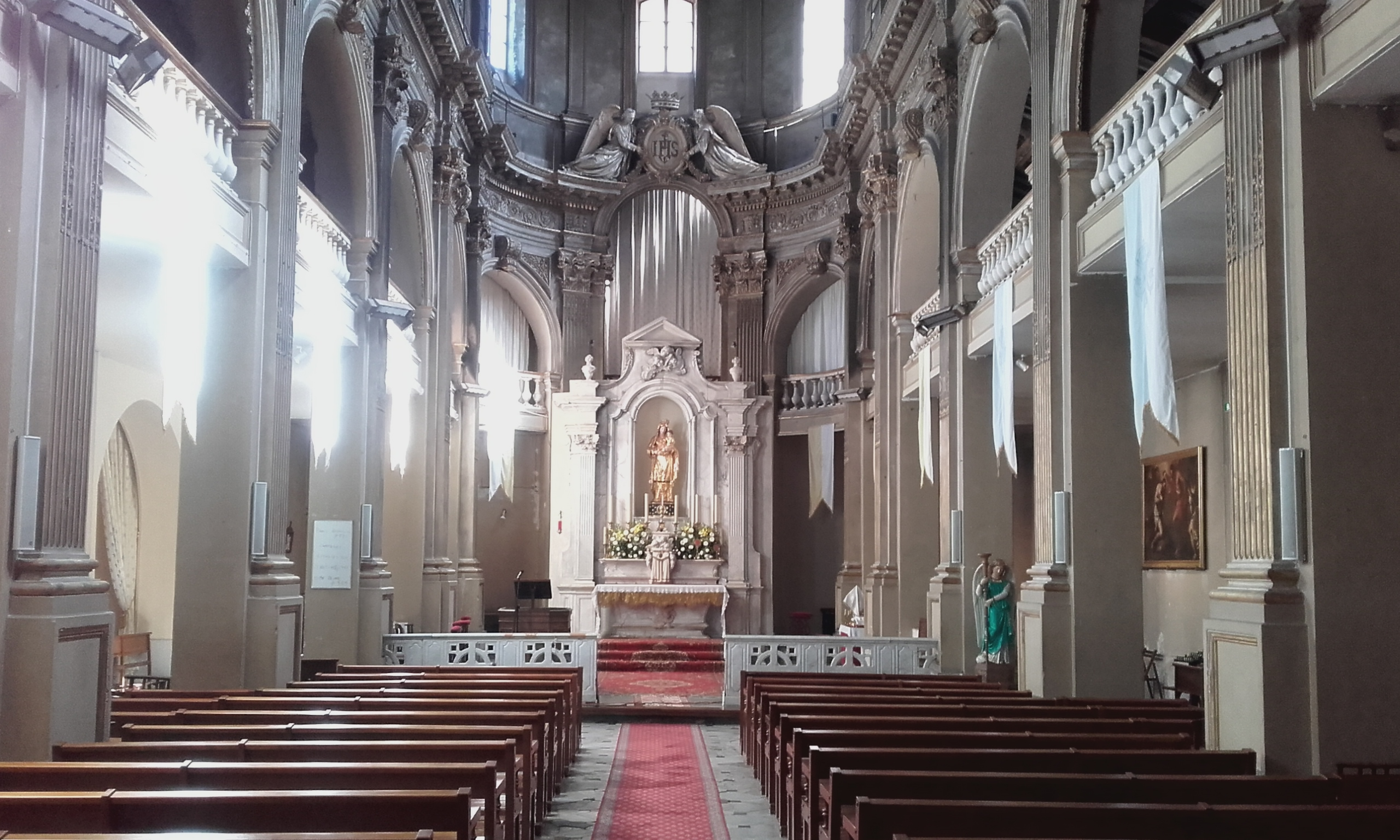
Church interior

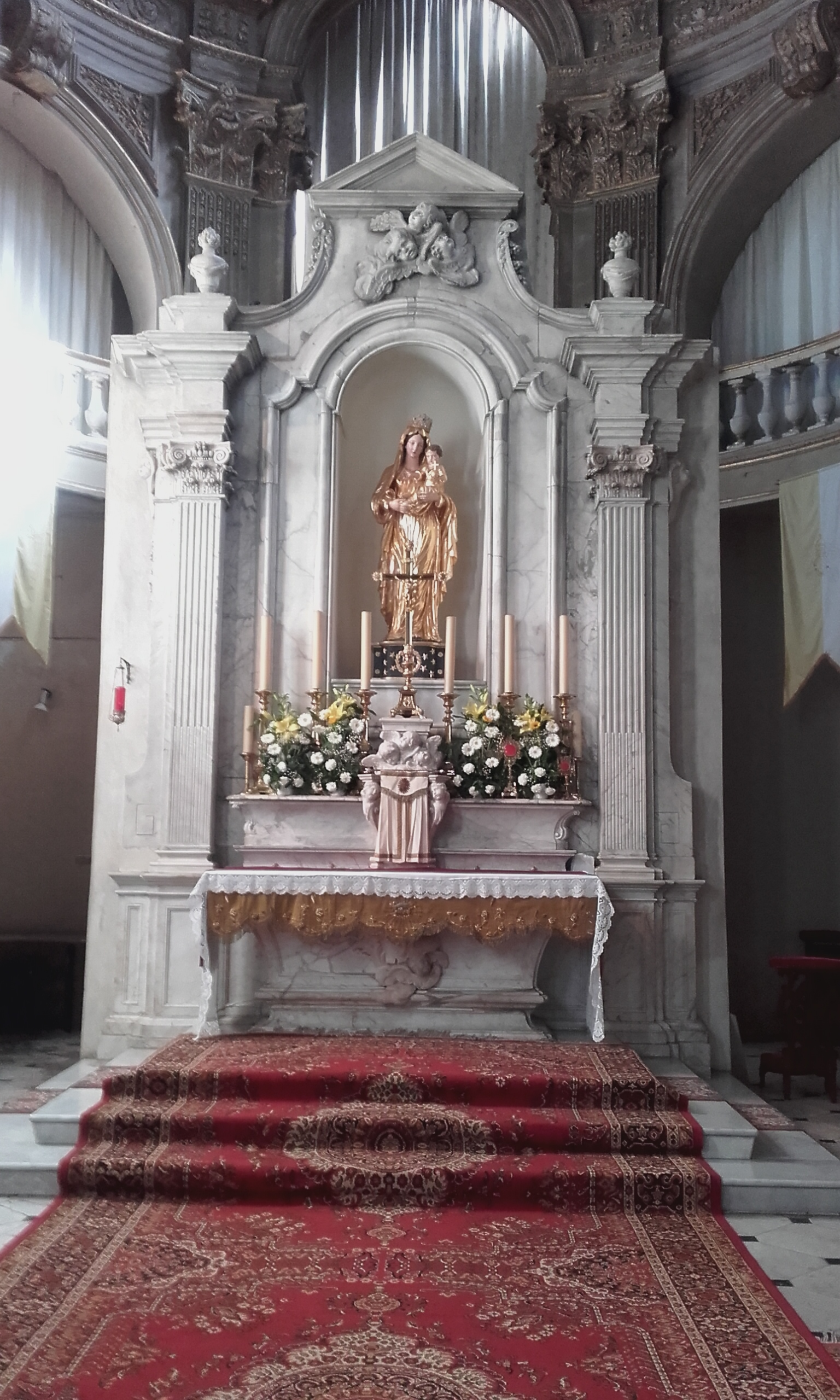
The altar

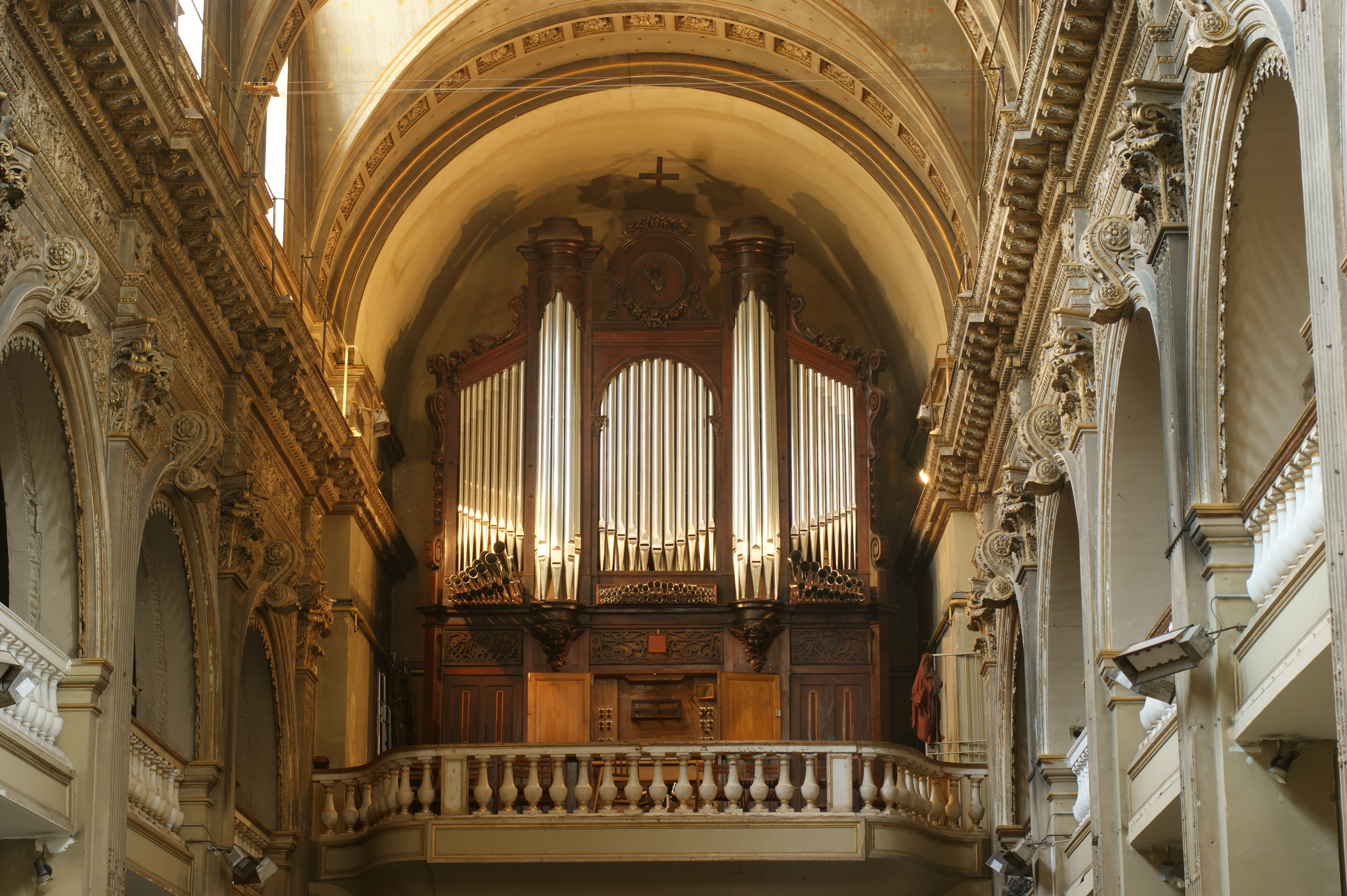
Gallery organ (2006)

== See also ==
- Congregation of the Mission
- Jesuits
- Priestly Fraternity of Saint Pius X
- Vincent de Paul
- Eugène de Mazenod
- French Revolution
- Saint-Sauveur Church in Brest

== Bibliography ==
- Sanchez, Jean-Michel (1996). Une Église de Marseille depuis le XVIIe siècle: La Mission de France [A Church in Marseille Since the 17th Century: The Mission of France] (in French). Marseille: La Thune. ISBN 2-9509917-0-X. Archived from the original on December 21, 2017.
- Cain, Jean-Robert; Laugier, Emmanuel (2010). Trésor des églises de Marseille: Patrimoine culturel communal [Treasure of Marseille’s Churches: Municipal Cultural Heritage] (in French). Marseille: Ville de Marseille. ISBN 978-2-9535530-0-0.
