= Eggers =

Eggers is a surname. Notable people with the surname include:

- Alfred J. Eggers (1922–2006), NASA administrator
- Bartholomeus Eggers (c.1637–1692), Flemish sculptor active in the Dutch Republic
- Dave Eggers (born 1970), American writer, editor and publisher
- Doug Eggers (1930–2025), American football player
- Frank H. Eggers (1901–1954), American politician
- Graydon Eggers, American football coach
- Hans Jürgen Eggers (1906–1975), German historian, eponymous of his Eggers chronology of the Roman imperial era
- Henrik Franz Alexander von Eggers (1844–1903), Danish soldier and botanist
- Jeff Eggers, American Navy SEAL, author, and security advisor
- Jens G. Eggers, British physicist
- Kira Eggers (born 1974), Danish model
- Kurt Eggers (1905–1943), German war correspondent and writer
- Matthias Eggers (born 1985), German politician
- Otto Reinhold Eggers (1882–1964), American architect in the firm Eggers & Higgins
- Per Eggers (born 1951), Swedish actor
- Peter Eggers (born 1980), Swedish actor
- Reinhold Eggers (1890–1974), German security officer at Colditz Castle
- Robert Eggers (born 1983), American screenwriter and director
- William D. Eggers (born 1967), American writer, government reform consultant

== See also ==
- Egger (surname)
