= Jean-Joseph Kapeller =

French painter and architect (1706–1790)

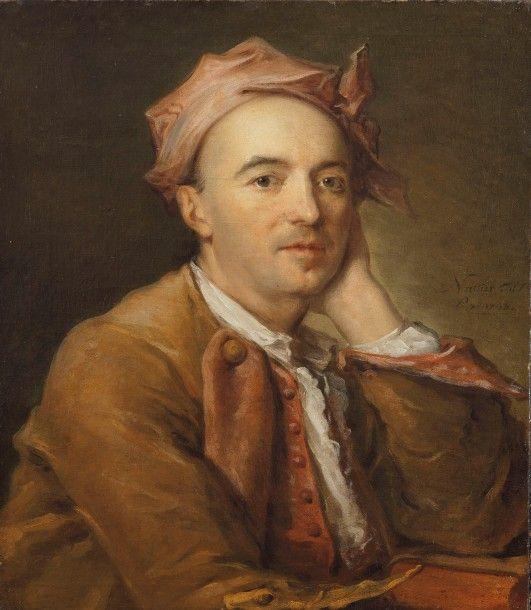
1753 portrait of Kapeller by Jean Frédéric Marc Nattier.

Jean-Joseph Kapeller (24 July 1706 – 29 November 1790) was a French painter, architect and geometer. Born in Marseille he was influenced by Jean-Baptiste de La Rose and Joseph Vernet, mainly producing landscapes and seascapes such as his 1756 masterwork Embarcation of the Expeditionary Corps for Minorca at the Port of Marseille under the command of the Duke of Richelieu. He and his contemporary Charles François Lacroix de Marseille produced seascapes which marked a step-change in the appreciation of seascapes in Provence in the second half of the 18th century.

Kapeller and Michel-François Dandré-Bardon co-founded Marseille's Académie de peinture et de sculpture, with Kapeller becoming its director-rector in 1771 and giving classes in drawing and gemotery there which were attended by his main pupil Henry d'Arles. Kapeller was also a major figure in freemasonry in the city, becoming grand master of the Chevaliers de l'Orient lodge. He also became rector of the third order Franciscans at the Récollets in 1745 and a member of a chapel of penitents. Famous in Marseille in his own time, he seems to have never become much known outside Provence and most of his works are now lost, though some now hang in public collections in Toulon and Marseille.

== Life ==
=== Early life ===
His father Jean-Georges had been born in Meilen, Zurich and married Marie-Anne Daignan in Marseille on 11 January 1701, the year before Jean-Joseph's birth. Jean-Georges was also a painter and seems to have been highly regarded by contemporary art critics, who referred to "the ardour of his zeal for everything which concerned the school, artists and matters of art". Jean-Georges died before 1723, possibly during the bout of plague which affected Marseille in 1723, according to Joseph Billioud.

Jean-Joseph Kapeller married Anne-Marie Mouren on 24 January 1723 in the collegiate church of Saint-Martin. The couple had two children, Marie-Eugénie (called "widow Mullard" in Jean-Joseph's will of 1778) and Pierre-Paul (a painter and teacher who was made an associate of the Académie in 1753 and settled in the Spanish colonies in South America, specialising in still lives of shellfish and exhibiting at the Académie de peinture in 1757).

=== Teacher ===
Kapeller's knowledge of architecture caused the Académie's permanent director Dandré-Bardon to make him its permanent professor of geometry, teaching classes which comprised "elementary geometry, transcendental geometery and sublime geometry which applied differential calculus, principally integral calculus to the knowledge of curves and surfaces". These classes were compulsory for all the Académie's pupils, including the future seascape painter Antoine Roux (1765 - 1835), since such knowledge was just as necessary to painters and sculptors as to astronomers and architects. These classes constituted an initial training in the field, which Kapeller also running a secondary course in the orders of architecture. Only after taking these preparatory classes could pupils move on to drawing the head and ornamentation.

Kapeller was lastly professor of "mechanics" (what is now known as orthography) according to the terms in the Académie's lists. The previous years' issues of the Almanach historique de Marseille by Grosson showed that Kappeler already ran a "school of mathematics, drawing and of civilian and military architecture" in his home on rue d'Aubagne.

According to professor Régis Bertrand, Kapeller seems to have retained his roles at the Académie until 1787 : an octogenarian, he was thus replaced by architect Jacques Dageville (1723–1794).

=== Pupils ===
In Marseille he combined his roles at the Académie with that of police commissioner (a purely honorary and unpaid role) for 16 years.
