= International Architecture Biennale of São Paulo =

Architecture exhibition

The International Architecture Biennale of São Paulo (Portuguese: Bienal Internacional de Arquitetura de São Paulo, BIA), Brazil, is an international exhibition to recognize art and innovation in architecture.

== History ==
The first BIA was held in 1973.

The BIA is held on alternating years from the São Paulo Art Biennial, another major international event hosted by the city. Both biennials used to be held in the Pavilhão Ciccillo Matarazzo building in the Ibirapuera Park (Parque do Ibirapuera). The large pavilion was designed by a team headed by Oscar Niemeyer and Hélio Uchôa.

The theme of the 2011 BIA was "Architecture for All – Building Citizenship". It took place November 1 to December 4, 2011.

The theme of the 2019 BIA was "Everyday". For the first time, the team was selected via an open call and an international jury selected the winning entry. The winning team was composed of Vanessa Grossman, Charlotte Malterre-Barthes, and Ciro Miguel. The 12th Biennale took place from September 10 to December 9, 2019, at Sesc 24 of May and Centro Cultural São Paulo.

== See also ==
- Architecture of Brazil
- Architectural design competition
