= Rue du Tapis-Vert =

Street in Marseille, France

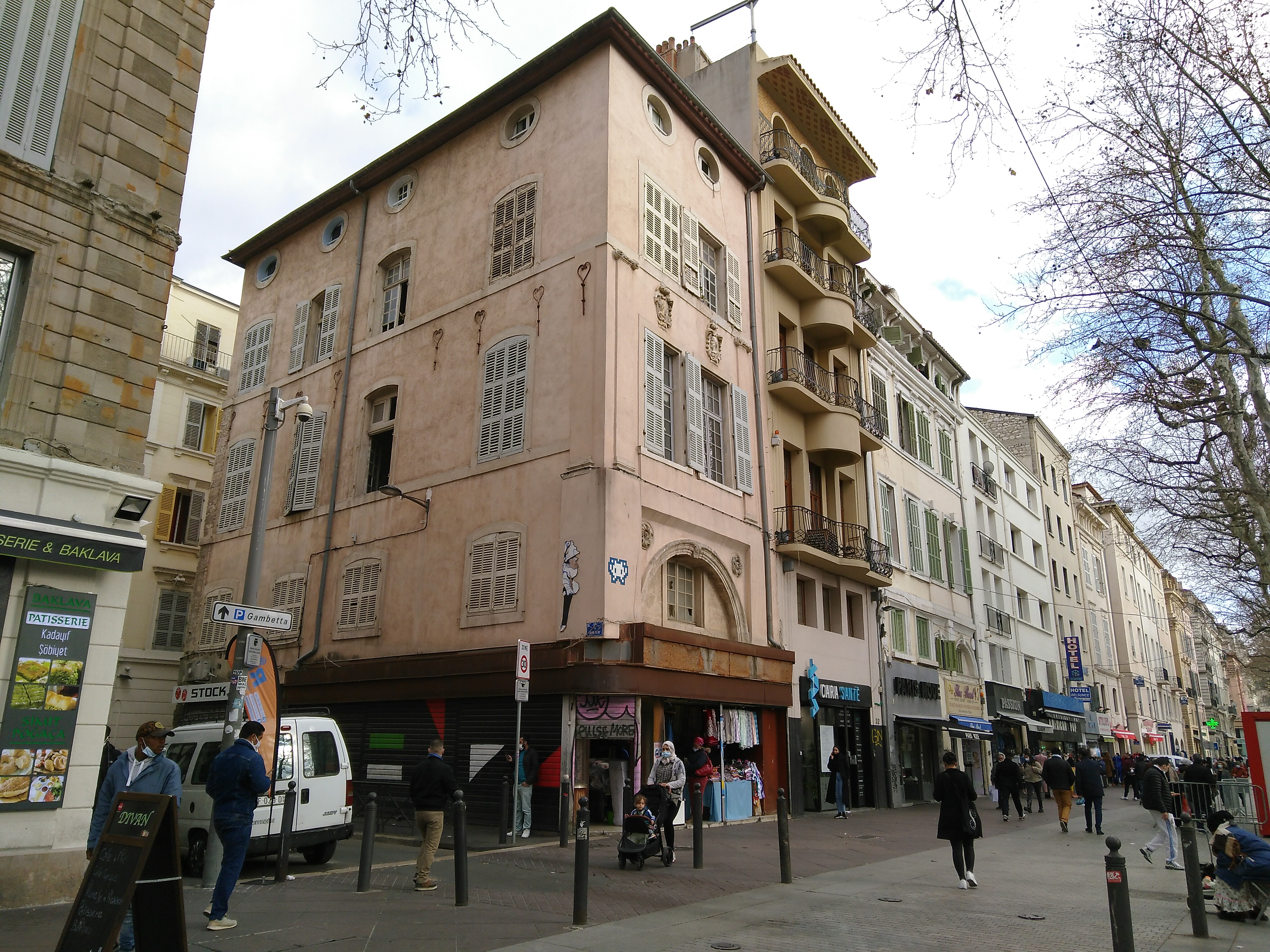
- House with two medallions, at the corner of the Rue Tapis-Vert and the Cours Belsunce
- Interactive map of Rue du Tapis-Vert
- Location: 1st arrondissement of Marseille
- Nearest metro station: Noailles

The Rue du Tapis-Vert (literally: Green Carpet Street) is a street in the 1st arrondissement of Marseille. The street contains the 17th-century Église de la Mission de France.

== History ==
From 1215 until 1524, there was a friar's convent located between the Rue du Tapis-Vert and the Canebière. The convent was destroyed during the siege of Marseille, which was led by Charles III, Duke of Bourbon under the orders of Charles V, Holy Roman Emperor, as part of the Italian War of 1521–1526. No. 22 Rue du Tapis-Vert was a convent for the Order of the Blessed Virgin Mary of Mercy until 1787, when it was converted into Marseille's first mint. It was here in 1794 that a solid silver statue of the Virgin Mary from the chapel at Notre-Dame de la Garde, dating from 1661, was melted down.

10 Rue du Tapis Vert was the birthplace of French doctor and politician Pierre Darquier in 1869. He was the father of Louis Darquier de Pellepoix, who was the Commissioner for Jewish Affairs in Vichy France. In the 17th century, 41 Rue du Tapis-Vert belong to local historian Antoine de Ruffi. In the 19th century, 39 Rue du Tapis-Vert was used as a printing press for a twice monthly medical publication.

=== Église de la Mission de France ===
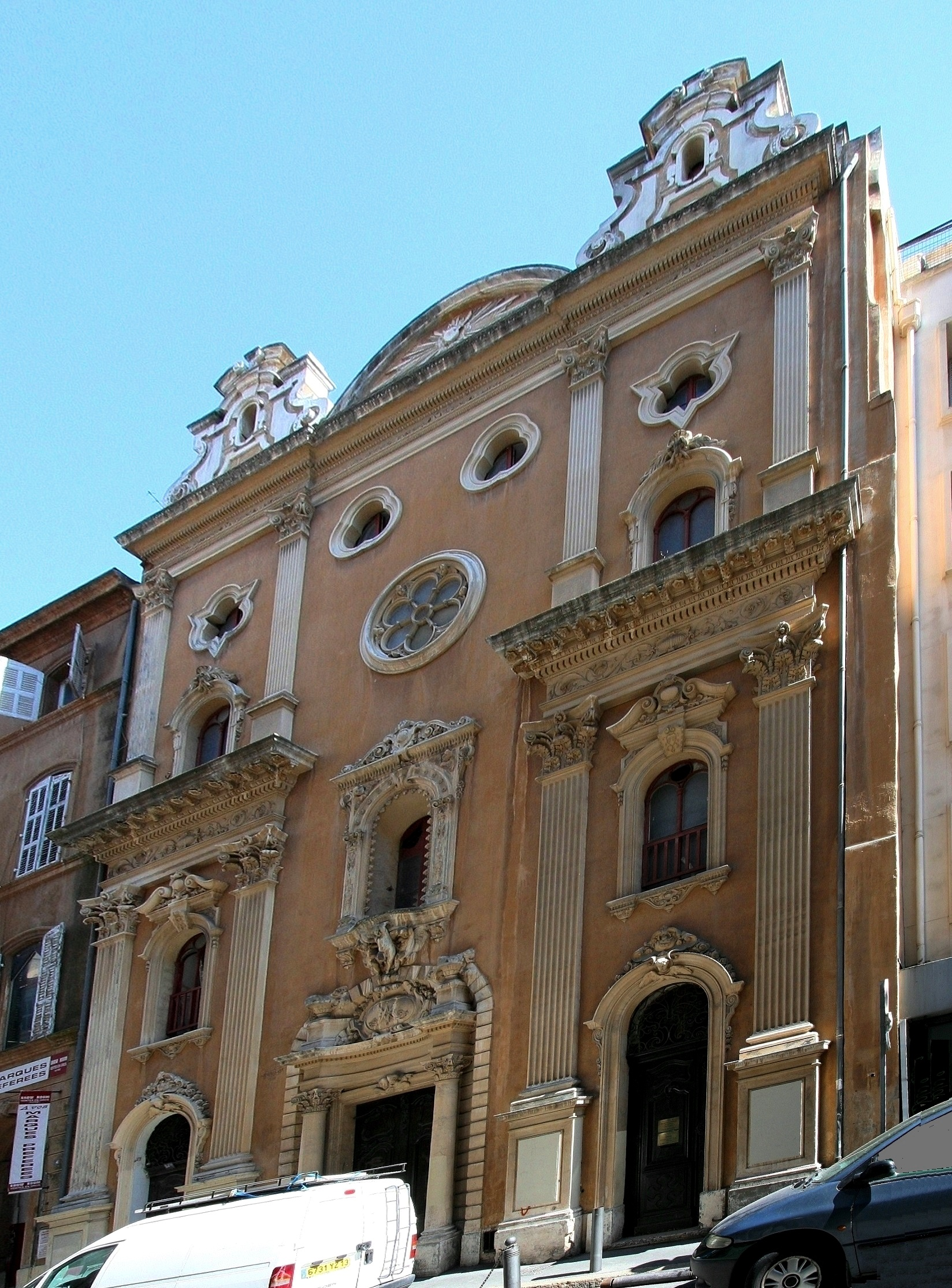
Church of the Mission of France (Église de la Mission de France) on the Rue du Tapis-Vert

The Church of the Mission of France is located at 44 Rue du Tapis-Vert. The church originated in the 17th century for priests of the Mission of France, a Roman Catholic order founded by Vincent de Paul. During the French Revolution, the church was used by Protestants from 1791 to 1794. The church was restored by Jesuits from 1841 to 1865. Since 1965, the church has been listed as a Monument historique.

== Modern day ==
The Rue du Tapis-Vert runs between the Place des Capucines and the Cours Belsunce in the 1st arrondissement of Marseille. It is a one-way street, and houses shops for shoes, clothes and costume jewellery. The street is notorious for being busy and suffers from high levels of pollution.
