= Henry d'Arles =

French painter (1734–1784)

Jean Henry, known as Henry d'Arles (14 September 1734 - 14 September 1784) was a French painter, mainly known for seascapes and mythological scenes.

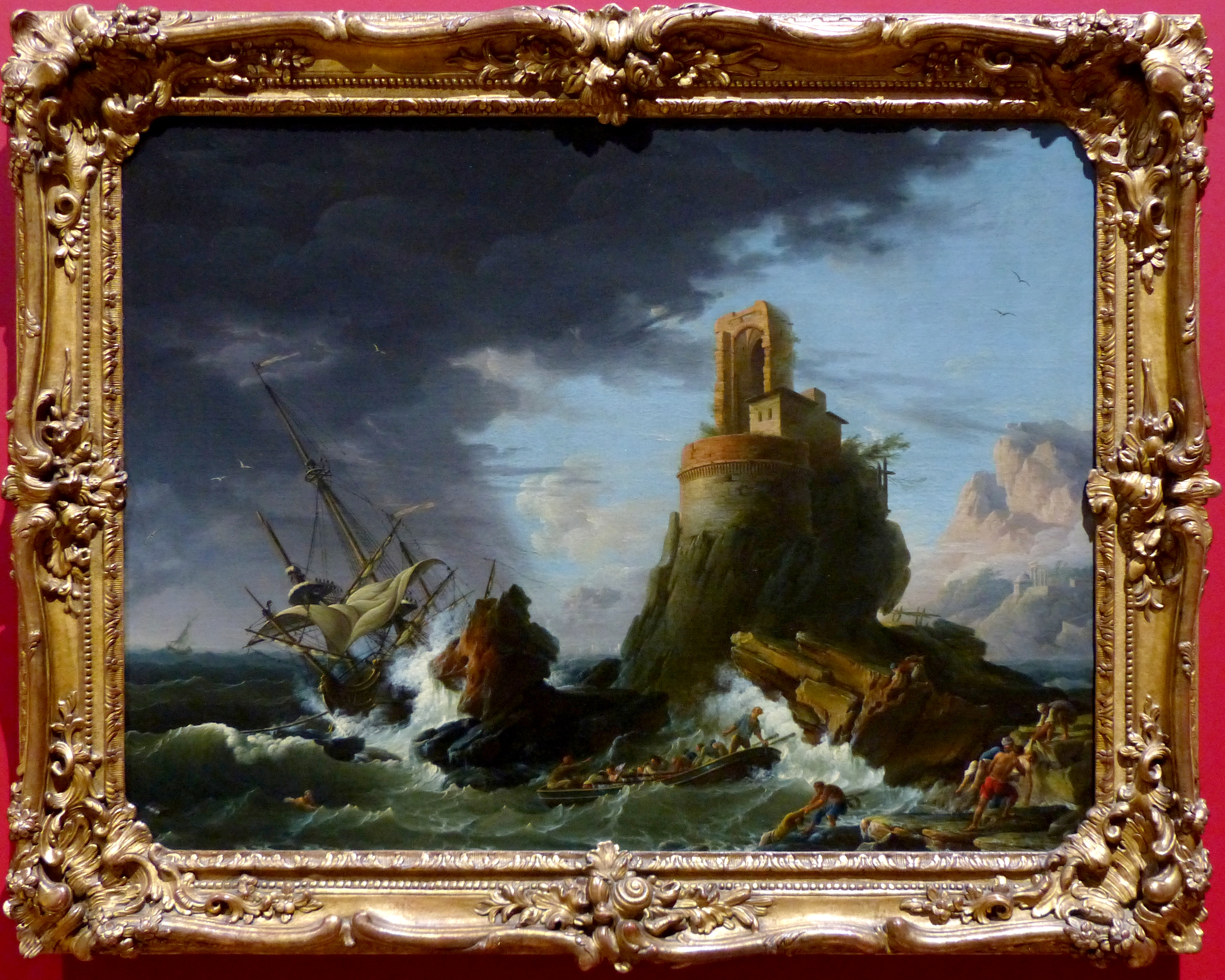
A Tempest (1756), musée des Beaux-Arts de Marseille.

== Life ==
Born in Arles to a clerk at the "bureau des fermes" in that town, from a very young age Jean Henry was devoted to art and he was presented to Jean-Joseph Kapeller, a painter who had come to the town to decorate the hôtel des fermes. Kapeller recognised Henry's talent and took him to Marseille to study at that city's painting academy, which Kapeller had set up in 1752. Henry graduated from that academy's first-ever competition the following year.

Around that time Claude Joseph Vernet had come to Marseille to paint its port. He asked Kapeller to loan him one of his students as a studio assistant and Kapeller selected Henry, on whom Vernet became a major influence, so much so that he was given the hostile nickname "Vernet's monkey". He frequented Marseille's port, dockyards and quays, never hesitating to spend a day out at sea in a storm, the better to understand nature's great spectacles.

Jean-Baptiste Rey provided Henry with enough funds to spend two years in Rome to complete his art training, returning at the height of his powers with the nickname "Henry d'Arles". In 1755 he applied to Marseille's painting academy as a fellow and was accepted the following year, with "A Tempest" (musée des beaux-arts de Marseille) as his diploma piece. He was made the academy's professor in 1776 on the death of his predecessor Zirio. He produced the decoration not only for Rey's hôtel particulier, but also for that of Guillaume de Paul, lieutenant-général de la sénéchaussée de Marseille, whilst the latter also houses some paintings by Henry.

Suffering from kidney stones, he underwent a surgical operation but did not recover. He died on his fiftieth birthday.

== Selected works ==
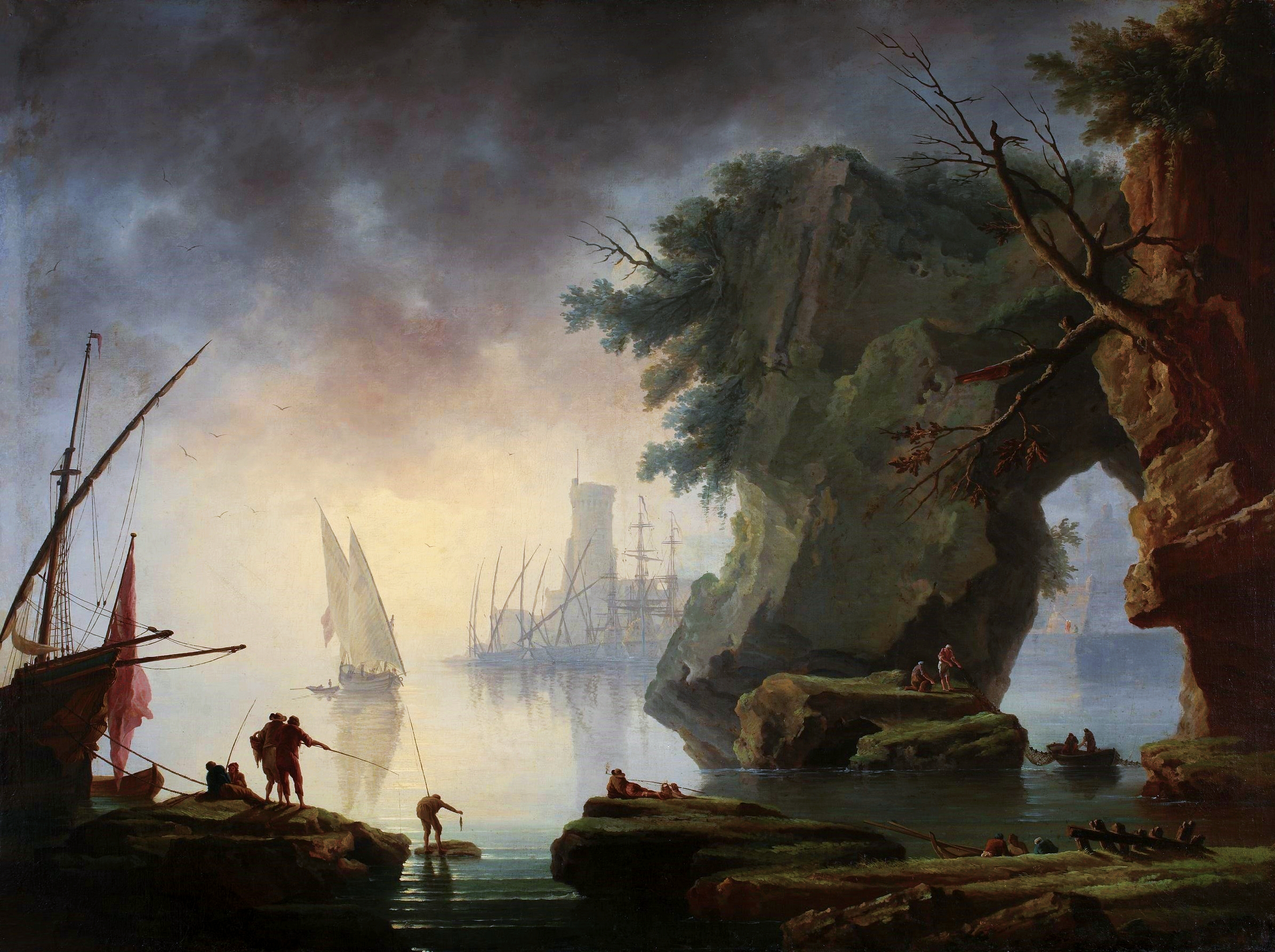
View of a port in the mist
