= Joseph Billioud =

French historian (1888–1963)

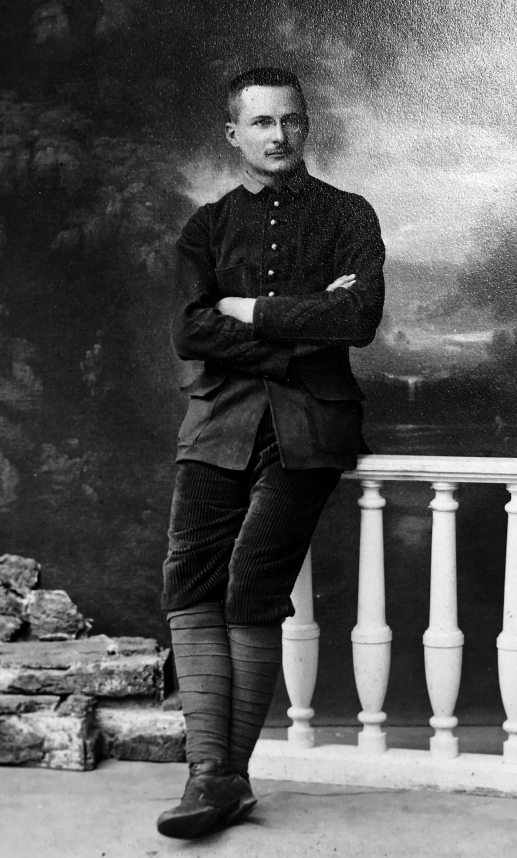
- Joseph Billioud,1917
- Born: 1 August 1888; Grièges (Ain), France
- Died: 7 March 1963 (aged 74); Marseille, France
- Occupation: Historian

Joseph Billioud (1 August 1888 – 7 March 1963) was a 20th-century French historian. The historian Jacques Billioud was his son and Jean-Michel Billioud, a writer and Yves Billioud, a lawyer, his grandsons.

== Biography ==
A student at École nationale des chartes, he graduated as archivist paleographer with a thesis entitled « Les États du duché de Bourgogne jusqu'en 1498 » (class 1911). Appointed chief curator of the library and archives of the city of Marseille, he authored more than 300 articles on the history of art and the economic life of Marseille and Provence. In 1950, along other scholars, he founded the Institut historique de Provence, the review Provence historique (organe de la Fédération historique de Provence) of which he became first director.

== Publications ==
- 1922: Les états de Bourgogne aux XIVe et XVe siècles
- 1924: Manuscrits à Enluminures exécutés pour des Bibliothèques Provençales (890-1704.)
- 1924: Les Manuscrits Liturgiques Provençaux du XIVe siècle, Mémoires de l'Institut Historique de Provence
- 1925: Le Roi des merciers du Comté de Provence aux XIV° et XV° siècles..., Bulletin philologique et historique
- 1926: Statuts des merciers de Provence à la fin du XV° siècle, Mémoires de l'Institut Historique de Provence
- 1929: De la confrérie à la corporation, les classes industrielles en Provence aux XIVe, XVe et XVIe siècles, Mémoires de l'Institut Historique de Provence
- 1931: La reprise de Toulon (1793) et l'opinion publique, in Mémoire I.H.P., (p. 249) (compte rendu d'ouvrage - Parès J.)
- 1932: Pals ou lys des plus anciens emblèmes du comté de Provence
- 1934: Les Gérard, architectes marseillais, Marseille, impr. Guéneux frères; Éditions du Vieux-Marseille
- 1937: Un Latour marseillais : Pierre Bernard (1704-1777), Gazette des beaux-arts, XI.1937, (pp. 237–252) (cf. table des matières, deuxième semestre 1937)
- 1938: Un peintre de types populaires : Françoise Duparc de Marseille, (1726-1778)
- 1951: Histoire du commerce de Marseille publiée par la Chambre de commerce de Marseille sous la direction de Gaston Rambert, tome III. De 1480 à 1515, par Raymond Collier, de 1515 à 1599, par Joseph Billioud, Paris, Plon
- 1952: Le Commerce de la glace naturelle à Marseille aux XVIIe et XVIIIe siècles..., Actes du 77e Congrès des Sociétés savantes. Grenoble
- 1962: Une médaille commémorative du combat devant Toulon (22 février 1744) in Provence Histoire, fascicule 47, 1962, (pp. 66–67) in Héraldique - Numismatique

== Bibliography ==
- Joseph Billioud, in Provence historique, tome 13, fascicule 54, 1963 read online.
