= Arsenal des galères =

Former military arsenal located in Marseille

- Arsenal des galères de Marseille (French)
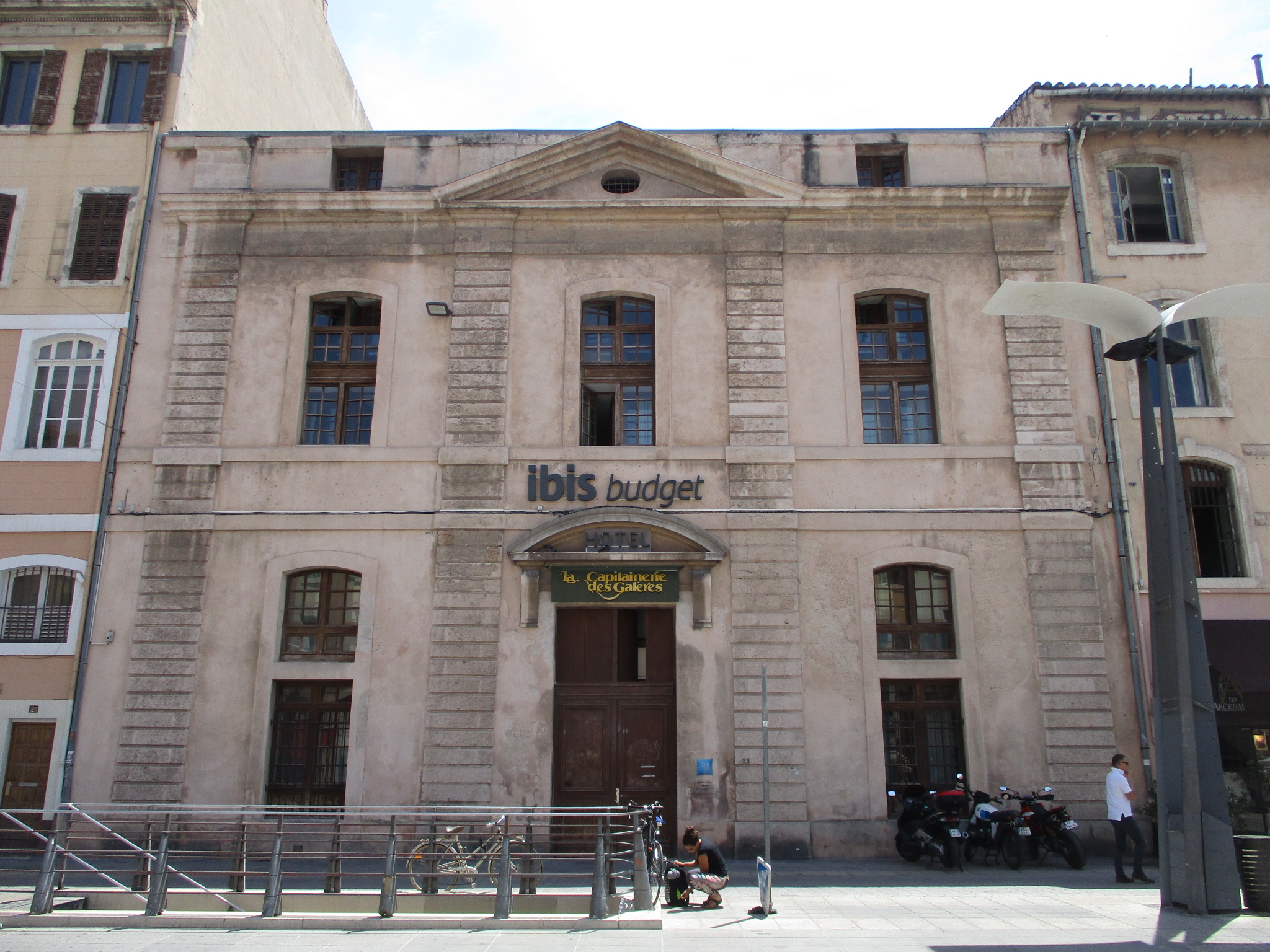
- The old harbour master's office.

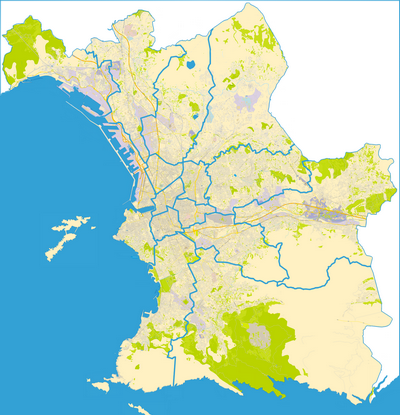
- Location within Marseille
- 43°17′33″N 5°22′24″E
- Location: France; Provence-Alpes-Côte d'Azur; Marseille

Monument historique
- Type: Arsenal

The Arsenal des Galères (lit. French for Galleys Arsenal) is a former military arsenal located in Marseille, France. It was built by Colbert in the second half of the 17th century to house and arm King Louis XIV's galleys, but was only fully operational for less than a hundred years, galleys rapidly losing their role in naval warfare to ships.

Until 1748, the Arsenal housed convicts sentenced to forced labor. It was located on the eastern and southern shores of the Old Port, and although almost nothing remains of it today, its location still marks the city's urban planning.

== History of the galleys ==
In Roman times, Marseille already had an arsenal of galleys. In his war against Caesar, Pompey sent seven galleys to Marseille as reinforcements, to attack Caesar's fleet of 17 galleys, 11 of which were decked. The Marseille arsenal was home to 10 galleys, several of which were on deck. The arsenal also housed a "weapons manufacturing" area. This military enclave was located on the south bank of the Lacydon, at Plan Fourmiguier (from today's Quai des Belges to the former careening basin).

In 1296, Charles II of Naples, then later Charles VIII (1495) and finally Louis XIV, through Colbert (second half of the 17th century), successively rebuilt or redeveloped the arsenal, to accommodate and arm the "king's galleys" - from Naples or France. Marseille was an important French war port on the Mediterranean Sea. The galley arsenal was occupied on a discontinuous basis. In its last period, it was operational for less than a hundred years, when Louis XV abolished the galleys (September 27, 1748), which had lost their role in naval warfare to ships in the early eighteenth century.

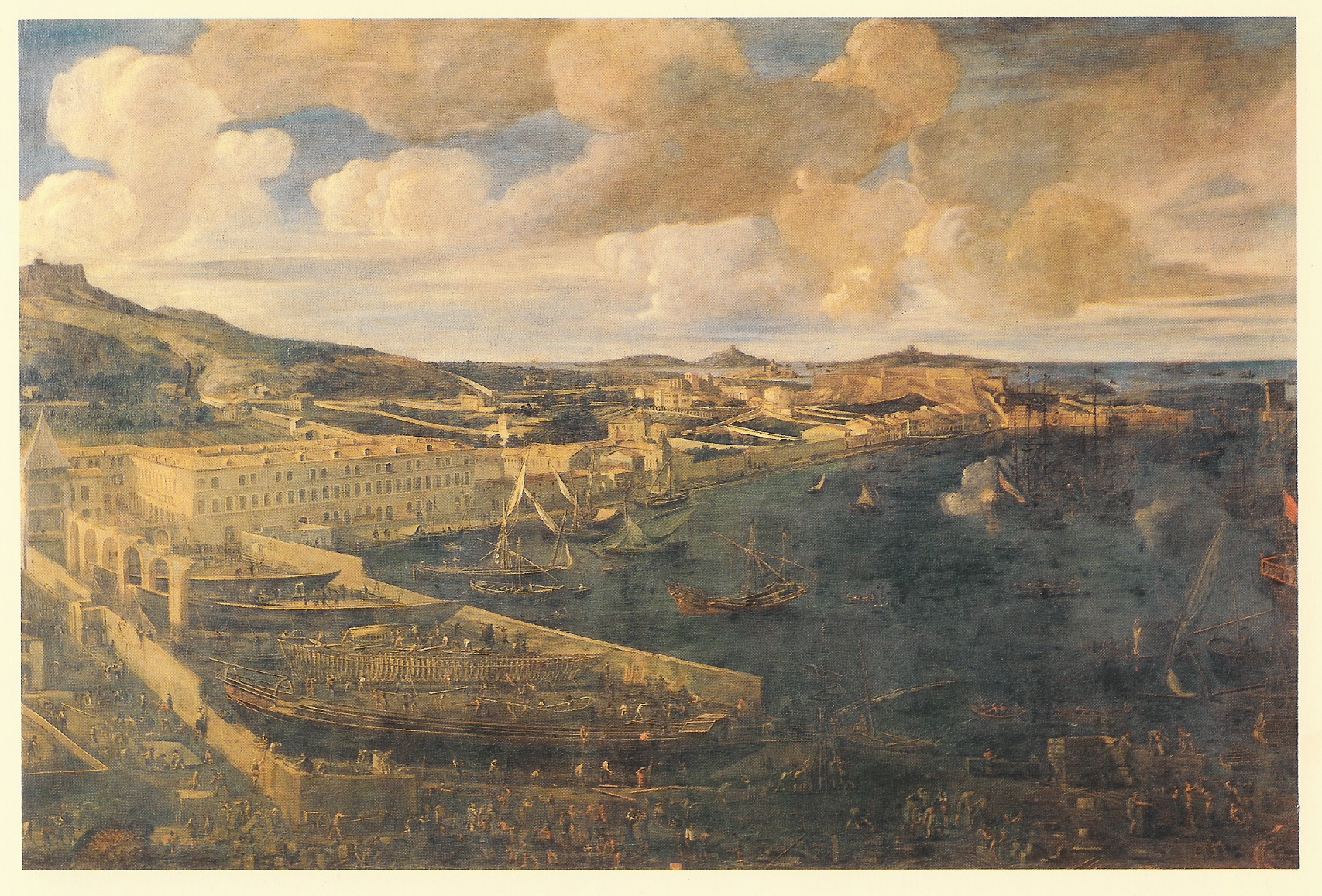
Arsenal des Galères de la ville de Marseille, Jean-Baptiste de La Rose, 1666, Musée de la Marine (Marseille) of the Chambre de commerce et d'industrie Aix Marseille-Provence.

Until 1748, the arsenal housed convicts sentenced to forced labour, the galley slaves. It was located to the east and south of the Old Port, and although almost nothing remains of it today (the Capitainerie, and an old discotheque from the 1960s, the "Arsenal des Galères", allowed visitors to observe the cells carved out of the rock of Notre-Dame de la Garde hill, and the access channel and galley basin were filled in during the 1910s), its location still marks the city's urban planning.

Dating from the mid-sixteenth century, Stolonomie, the oldest known treatise on galleys, deploys a nautical vocabulary specific to the ports of Marseille and Toulon.

== Early installations ==
=== Arsenal of the Counts of Provence ===
No trace has yet been found of the arsenal dating back to Roman times. At the end of the 13th century, the Counts of Provence, kings of Naples, created a war port in Marseille. Charles I d'Anjou established an arsenal where galleys were built. These were actually tercenaux, i.e. sheds where masts, ropes, sails, pulleys, oars and artillery were stored.

Some forty galleys took part in battles against the King of Aragon's fleet. The Provençal fleet was commanded by an admiral, such as Barthélemy Bonvin, who also served under Charles II of Naples or Guillaume Cornut (or Cornuti), killed at the naval battle of Malta on July 8, 1283. He was independent of the Admiral of Sicily, and acted under the direct orders of the King.

In 1296, Charles II created a special admiralty in Provence and, at the request of his seneschal of Provence, the city of Marseille granted him the shipyards of Plan Fourmiguier, an area at the far end of the Vieux-Port, on the site of today's Quai des Belges. The new admiral was Richard de Lamanon, keeper of Marseille's arsenal and galleys. The Admiral of Provence was responsible for appointing the captains of the galleys and exercising civil and criminal authority over all the men in the fleet. This organization continued until the end of Charles II's reign.

The city of Marseille struggled to regain the use of the Fourmiguier plan. This was achieved in 1320, when the fustiers (carpenters) resumed their activity on the site. King Robert the Wise ordered the creation of new tercenaux to the east of the Rive-Neuve quay for the manufacture of galleys, in order to continue the reconquest of Sicily, lost after the Sicilian Vespers.

King Charles IV of France, planning a new crusade, had galleys built in Marseille, probably on the tercenaux belonging to his cousin King Robert. These buildings were abandoned in the middle of the 14th century.

=== Arsenal of kings Charles VIII and Louis XII ===
Following the union of Provence with the Kingdom of France, and the death of Charles III of Provence, the last Count of Provence, on December 11, 1481, Charles VIII, King of France, wanted to assert his rights over the Kingdom of Naples. He had a new arsenal with six terracenals built in the southeast corner of the port. In August 1488, he wrote to promote the construction of several galleys in Provençal shipyards. In 1494, as Charles VIII sailed overland to southern Italy, a Provençal fleet of six galleys joined him in Naples.

In 1512, Louis XII ordered the construction of twelve additional tercenals, of which six were built. The arsenal of Charles VIII and Louis XII fell into disrepair, as shown by Jean Roulx's report on his installation in 1570 as keeper of the Marseille arsenal.

=== The Arsenal in the 16th and early 17th centuries ===
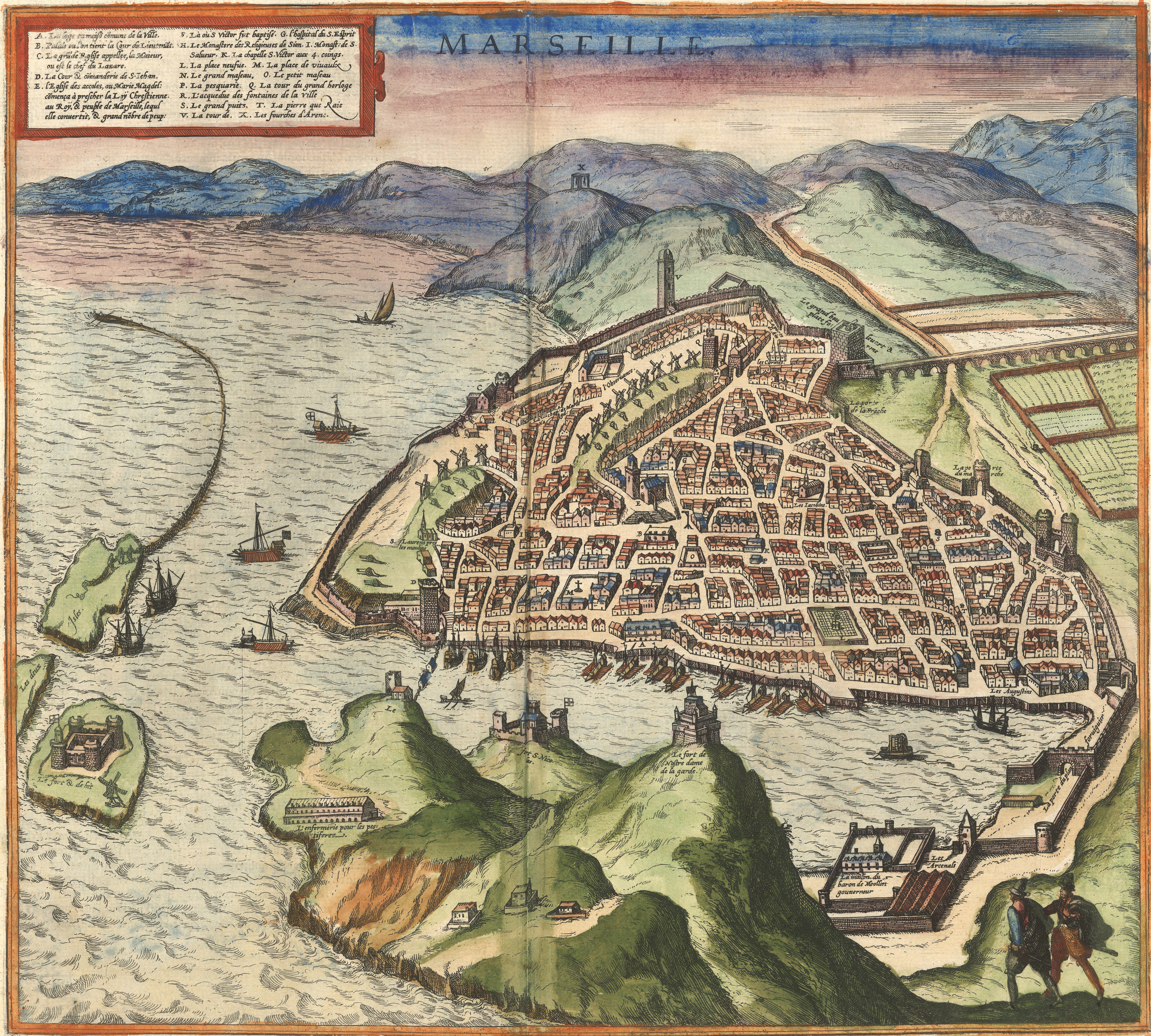
The galleys in the port and roadstead of Marseille, Atlas of 1584

In 1536, under the reign of Francis I, Marseille had 23 galleys in its port. In September 1533, Catherine de Medici made the journey from Florence (more precisely, from the port of Ostia) to Marseille on the galley of the pope, her uncle Clement VII, to marry the Dauphin, the future Henri II. The peak in the number of galleys was reached during his reign, as he attached great importance to naval power. In 1548, a record 42 galleys were built in the port of Marseille.

Shortly after the king's death and the end of the wars, the decline resumed, and by 1561 only 13 galleys remained, between those sent for reform and those given to the powerful. Galleys were fragile, high-maintenance vessels. It was more economical for the King to lease them to owners, such as the Valbelle family, captain of the Galleys from father to son. In 1578, the Grand Prieur Henri d'Angoulême was able to state in his remonstrances that, of the 18 galleys stationed in Marseille and Toulon, only a couple were fit for sea. Under Henri IV, the decline continued due to a lack of funding, so much so that when the king married Marie de Medici, foreign galleys belonging to the Pope, the Duke of Tuscany and the Knights Hospitaller brought the princess to Marseille on November 3, 1600.

As soon as he came to power, Richelieu relaunched galley construction. At the beginning of 1624, the galleys were transferred from Marseille to Toulon, to better fight the barbary pirates threatening the Îles d'Hyères. After a brief return to Marseille, the galleys moved back to Toulon as a plague epidemic ravaged Marseille in 1649.

=== Prisoners' hospital ===
Shortly before the galleys were transferred from Marseille to Toulon, a prisoners' hospital was opened. It was set up in 1646 on the initiative of a Provençal gentleman, Gaspard de Simiane, sieur de la Coste, knight of Malta, renowned for his piety and charity, and the bishop of Marseille, Jean-Baptiste Gault. They approached the Duchess of Aiguillon, niece of Cardinal Richelieu, who financed the project. The king offered the land occupied by four tercenaux dating back to the time of Charles VIII, and undertook, under letters patent of July 1646, to cover the operating costs of this royal hospital for convicts.

The hospital was located in the southeast corner of the port, on the Quai de Rive-Neuve, near the present-day Cours Jean-Ballard. It had 175 double beds. Its staff included a doctor, a surgeon, six apothecary boys and five nurses. Management of the hospital was entrusted to four administrators. The first administrators were Henri d'Armand, Treasurer of France, Pierre de Bausset, Lord of Roquefort, Gaspard de Simiane de la Coste, Knight of Malta, and Charles Moulas, Esquire. Two new administrators were appointed each year. The hospital was later incorporated into the arsenal created under Colbert.

=== Galley surgeons ===
The first shipboard surgeons are mentioned from 1540 onwards on the King's galleys. The Marseille galleys had hospital structures modelled on those of the Maltese galleys, with a prisoners' hospital, a crews' hospital, a botanical garden and an anatomy school.

The galleys were "France's biggest rotting ground for men", with only one man in two ever leaving alive. There were an average of 300 galley slaves on each galley, with 52 to 64 shoals of 5 galley slaves chained to each shoal, day and night, for 2 to 3 months, which was the average length of a campaign.

As for the galley surgeon, he was a Mediterranean civil servant appointed by competitive examination to a very small corps. He sailed only six months a year in summer, and stayed ashore in winter.

==== François Chabert: a galley surgeon ====
He was appointed surgeon to the galleys in 1689, and became Master Sworn Surgeon of the city of Marseille in 1689, and surgeon general of the galleys and their hospitals in 1703. He served for 50 years. In 1689, he began writing observations on practical surgery, which were published in 1724.

==== Master Antoine Moulinneuf: a galley surgeon ====
Born in La Rochelle in 1668, his personal and professional life is best known through the abundant correspondence he preserved. Fatherless from an early age, a surgeon-major had him embark with him "as surgeon" on the Hasardeux, Mr. Colbert de Saint-Mars's vessel, during the campaigns of Cape Vert et La Mérique and Algiers (1683). On March 12, 1685, after being examined by two surgeons, he was appointed surgeon on the Renommée galley.

In 1690, he moved to the Atlantic coast and embarked on the Heureuse, under the command of Captain Chevalier de Blicourt-Tincourt, but the squadron took 35 days to reach Cherbourg, arriving too late to take part in the battle that Tourville won over the Anglo-Dutch on July 7, at the naval battle of Béveziers, which pitted a French fleet against an Anglo-Dutch fleet on July 7, 1690 during the War of the League of Augsburg. However, he did take part in the Teignmouth landing on August 5.

Taking his profession to heart, he overstepped the boundaries of his surgeon's status and "did" medicine, proposing a remedy for dropsy - the term used to describe generalized oedema at the time. But the faculty complained to the Intendant Général des Galères, who dismissed him despite the fact that he had been serving for 10 years on the Renommée, with glowing service records mentioned by his captain.

He was reinstated on the galley La Vieille Réale, which no longer sailed, and was used as a depot, infirmary and home for sick and injured convicts. In addition, he received only 30 livres per month, instead of 70. Then, for several years, he was transferred to La Reyne, where he bowed to the doctors and was paid 50 livres a month, based on their good report. La Reyne was broken up and, due to the financial crisis, was not replaced. But thanks to the support of a number of important figures in the dropsy field, Moulinneuf was reinstated on La Magnanime on July 28, 1701. He joined his ship in Cadiz, where the galley squadron stayed for two years (1702-1703), built up a good Spanish clientele and returned to Marseille.

He was seconded to La Guerrière for the 1704 campaign, but as the galleys went out less and less, his time was over. On land, he became a specialist in dropsy, despite a new outcry from local doctors after the death of another patient, captain of a galley in the port. On November 9, 1711, he had the attestation given by Fagon, the First physician to the king, and all his captains' eulogistic certificates registered with the Parliament of Aix, and enjoyed a certain degree of peace of mind, on condition that he treated only dropsy.

He left La Magnanime on February 15, 1716 and moved on to La Fleur-de-Lys, retiring in 1718 at the age of 55. He was recalled on August 10, 1720, during the terrible plague epidemic in Marseille. His letters mention a balm he had developed against furunculosis and plague. Unfortunately, this balm did not prevent Maître Antoine Moulinneuf from dying of the plague a month later, on September 15, 1720.

== Louis XIV's arsenal ==
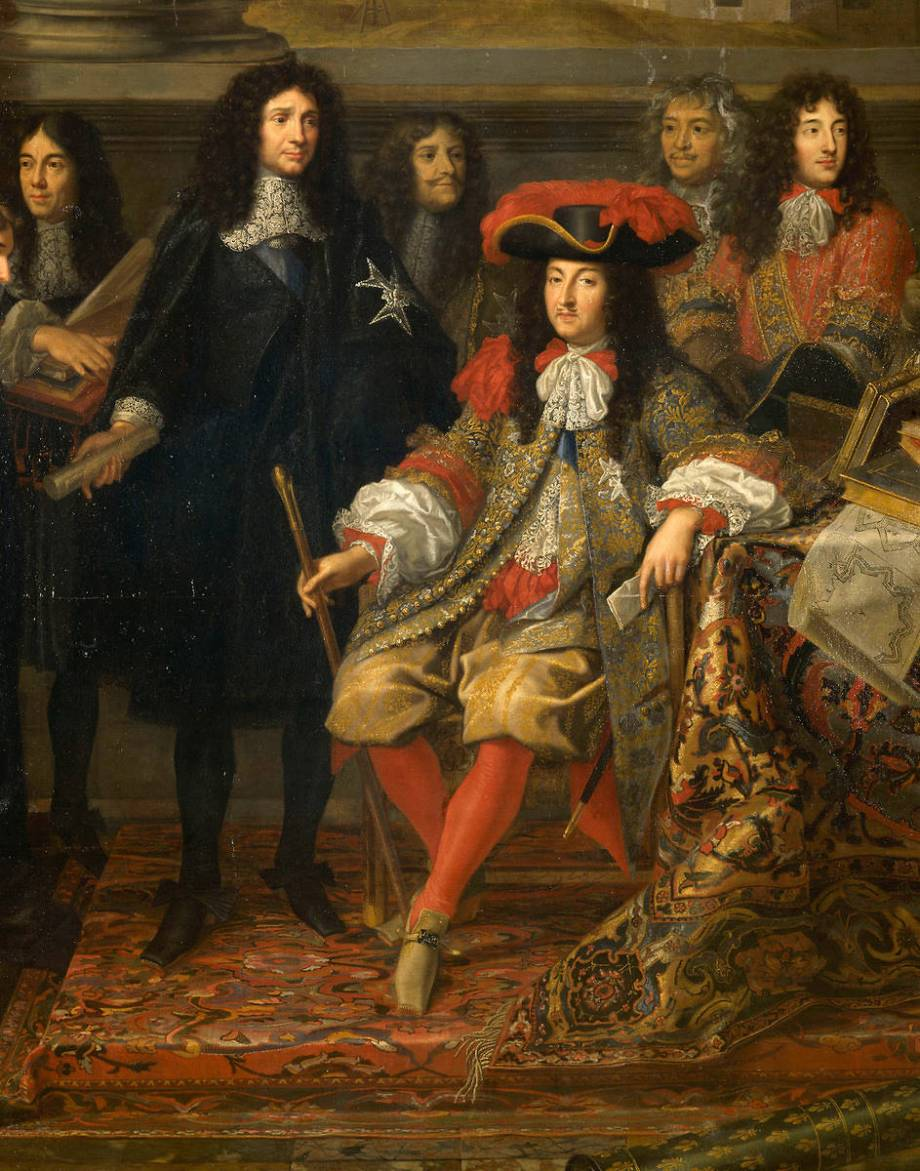
King Louis XIV and Colbert by Charles Le Brun, 1667.

When Louis XIV came to Marseille in 1660, the port was no longer home to a war fleet. Indeed, the galleys were languishing in Toulon, where only six capable of taking to sea and 1,655 men of the chiourme remained. The King wanted a fleet that would surpass those of Spain and the Italian powers. However, the presence of such a fleet demanded sufficient infrastructure to accommodate, maintain and supply it.

On April 10, 1665, Nicolas Arnoul was appointed "intendant de justice, police et finances des fortifications de Provence et de Piémont et des galères de France" (Intendant of justice, police and finances for the fortifications of Provence and Piedmont and the galleys of France). This made him lieutenant-general and military commander under the Admiral's authority. He was in charge of administration, stewardship and the corresponding staff (the officiers de plume, lit. French for pen officers).

On July 24, 1665, an order from Louis XIV was sent to the aldermen of Marseille, in which the king expressed his desire to arm the galleys and build an arsenal with the necessary resources, by making available in the port a place "suitable for storing wood, irons, antennae, masts, cannons and other things necessary for the armament and construction of the galleys".

This "galley park" was to be built in three phases:

=== First phase (1665-1669) ===
As soon as he arrived in Marseille, Nicolas Arnoul moved fast. He brought the Galères back from Toulon and then began by choosing a site for the arsenal. Contrary to Colbert's orders, who wanted an entirely unused site to be found, he annexed the site on the Fourmiguier plan (currently from the Quai des Belges to the careening basin), where Marseille's merchant ships were built, and presented the aldermen with a plan to build a new arsenal. The municipal shipyard was transferred to the Bernardines garden.

Construction of the new arsenal kept Nicolas Arnoul busy for four years (1665-1669). The work was carried out under the direction of Gaspard Puget, brother of Pierre Puget, who was working in Genoa at the time.

Colbert came to Marseille in June 1669, just as the work was nearing completion.

=== Second phase (1673-1679) ===
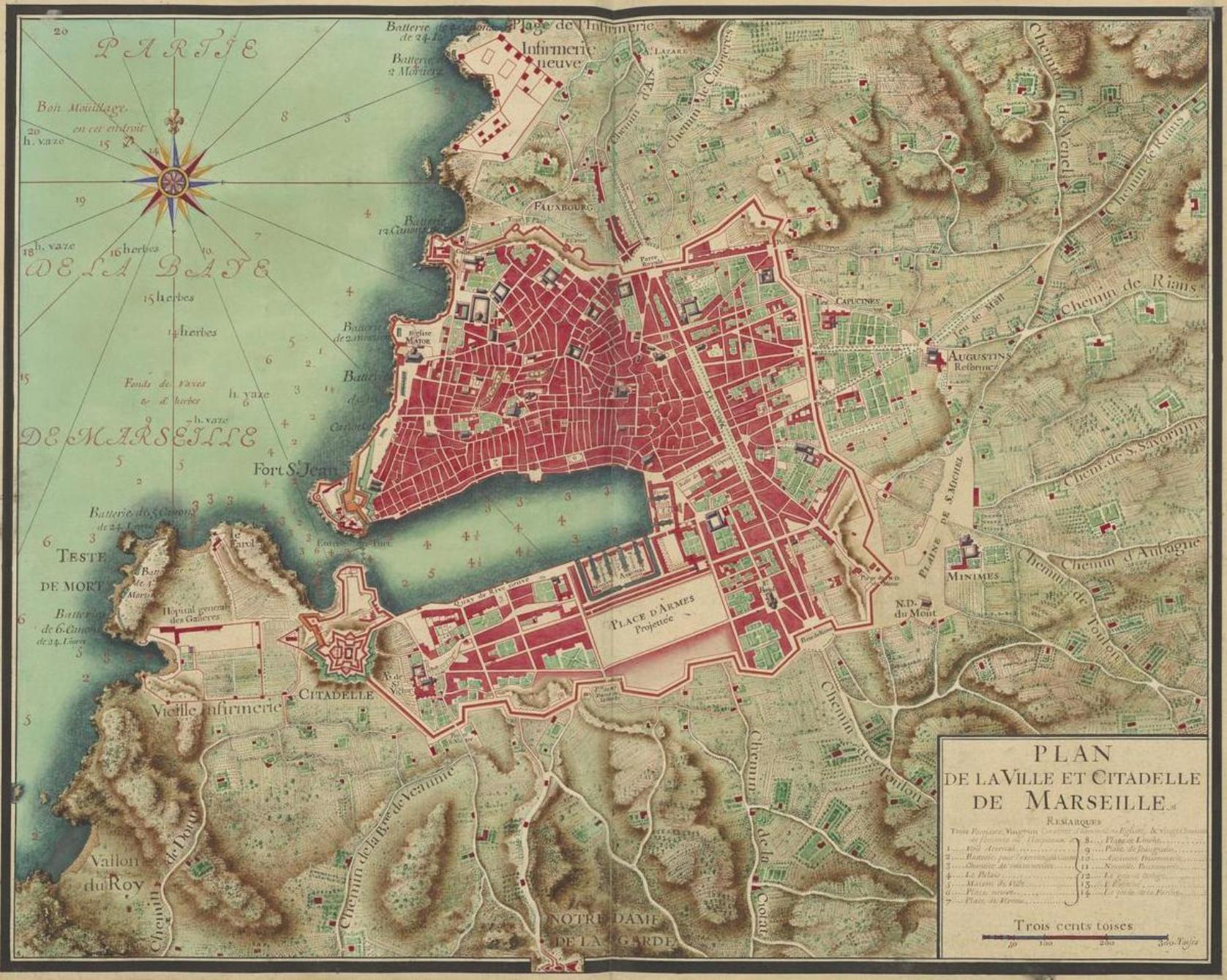
Map of Marseille in 1700. The arsenal stands near the planned Place d'Armes.

As soon as the first works were commissioned, Arnoul realized the inadequacy of this project and planned to extend the arsenal beyond the southeast corner of the port, along the Quai de Rive-Neuve, by expropriating the Capuchin convent. Arnoul became embroiled in an acute conflict with the aldermen, supported by the Duke of Mercœur.

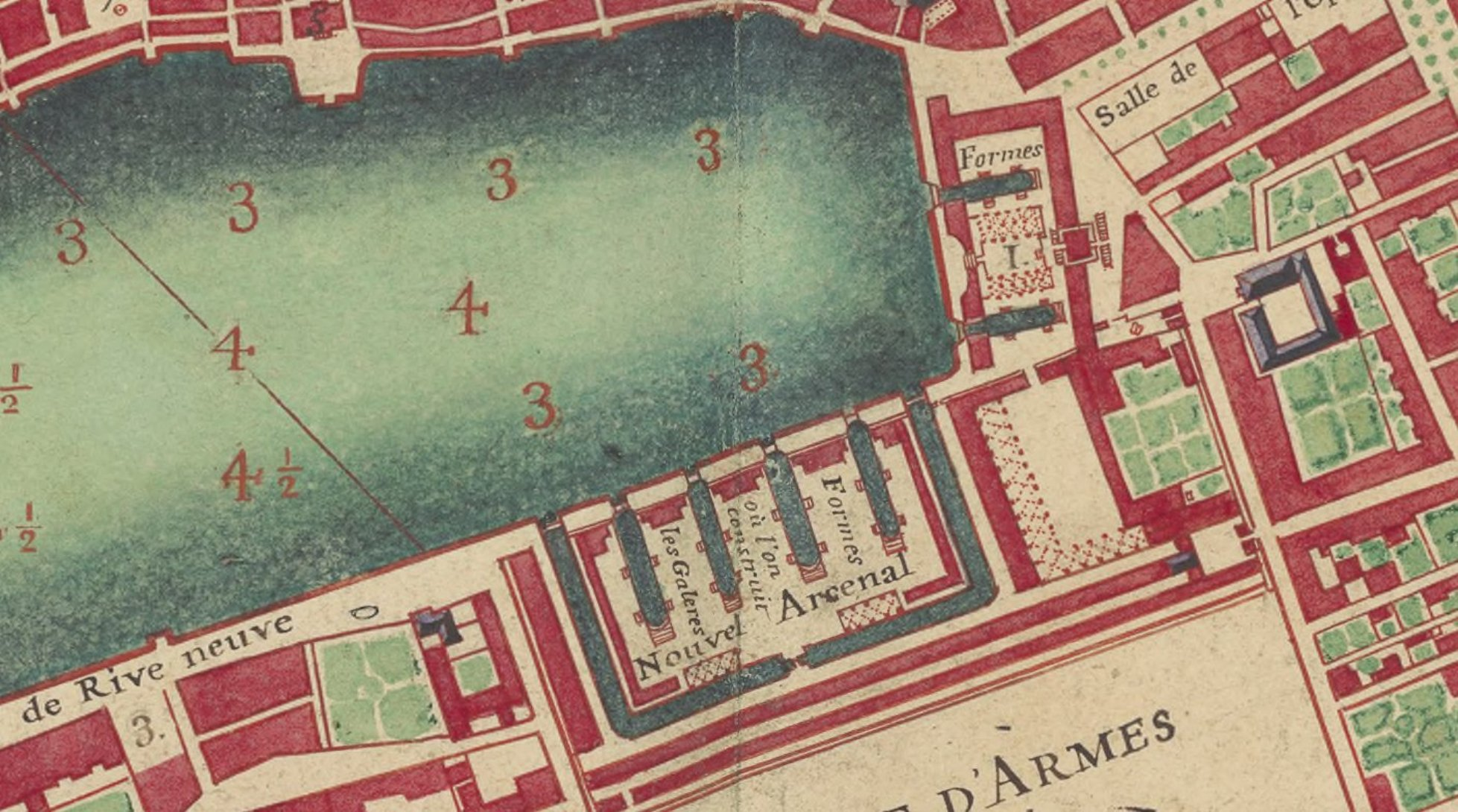
Map of the galley arsenal. This 1700 document shows the evolution of the arsenal, with the number 1 representing the first phase of development (detail of previous plan).

In 1673, thanks to the intervention of the Bishop of Marseille, Toussaint de Forbin-Janson, the Capuchin convent, which adjoined the convict hospital, was acquired. The new works lasted until 1679, with a certain Pierre Puget as contractor, often confused with his famous cousin, the sculptor Pierre Puget.

=== Third phase (1685-1690) ===
After a new series of expropriations, the galleys' arsenal, which now extended as far as rue du Fort-Notre-Dame, was completed. The people of Marseilles once again lost their shipbuilding yard, which had to be transferred further west to the Miséricorde site.

A project was drawn up by Antoine Niquet, Chief Engineer for Fortifications, and accepted in 1685 by the Marquis of Seignelay, son of Colbert. Demolition began the same year. Construction work, entrusted to André Boyer, architect of the Bâtiments du Roi, continued from 1686 to 1690, with the section built in 1665-1669 being known as the "old park" (fr: vieux parc).

The Arsenal complex was then shaped like a capital L, with the horizontal bar representing the Quai des Belges and the vertical bar the Quai de Rive-Neuve. It encompassed the land now bounded by the Augustins church, the Palais de la Bourse, Place du Général de Gaulle, Rue Paradis, Rue Sainte and Rue du Fort Notre-Dame.

The former Arsenal's horseshoe-shaped entrance is located on Quai des Belges. Opposite this entrance gate stands a large pavilion topped by a clock and placed in the axis of the rue Pavillon to which it gave its name.

This former arsenal also housed two galley-building docks, as well as stores for the galleys' oars, ropes and rigging. To the north was the galley hospital, a lumber yard, the steward's quarters and the king's garden, containing rare plants and cages of exotic animals. This sumptuous steward's residence became known as the King's House. Between the latter and the timber courtyard stood a building with stores on the first floor and the famous arms room on the second floor. The latter, housing 10,000 muskets and as many sabres, was once considered the finest in Europe.

The new arsenal occupied the southern part of the old arsenal and the rive neuve quay. The entrance gate faced east, along what is now Rue Paradis. Above this gateway, Jean-Baptiste Grosson noted that a cartouche read the proud praise of the Sun King: Hanc magnus Lodoix invictis classibus arcem condivit hinc domito dat sua jura mari (lit. Latin for "The great Louis of invincible fleets built this citadel; from here he dictates his laws to the tamed sea"). The new arsenal also featured:

- two dry docks for galley construction, but larger than those in the old arsenal.
- an L-shaped dock connected to the old port, which would become the Canal de la Douane after the arsenal was demolished, occupying today's Place aux Huiles and Cours d'Estienne d'Orves.
- running parallel to Rue Sainte, two huge buildings 450 meters long, separated by a street, housed the workshops and the bagne (penal establishment for forced labor), the one closest to the port, and the rope-making workshop, the one furthest south.

=== Evolution of activity ===
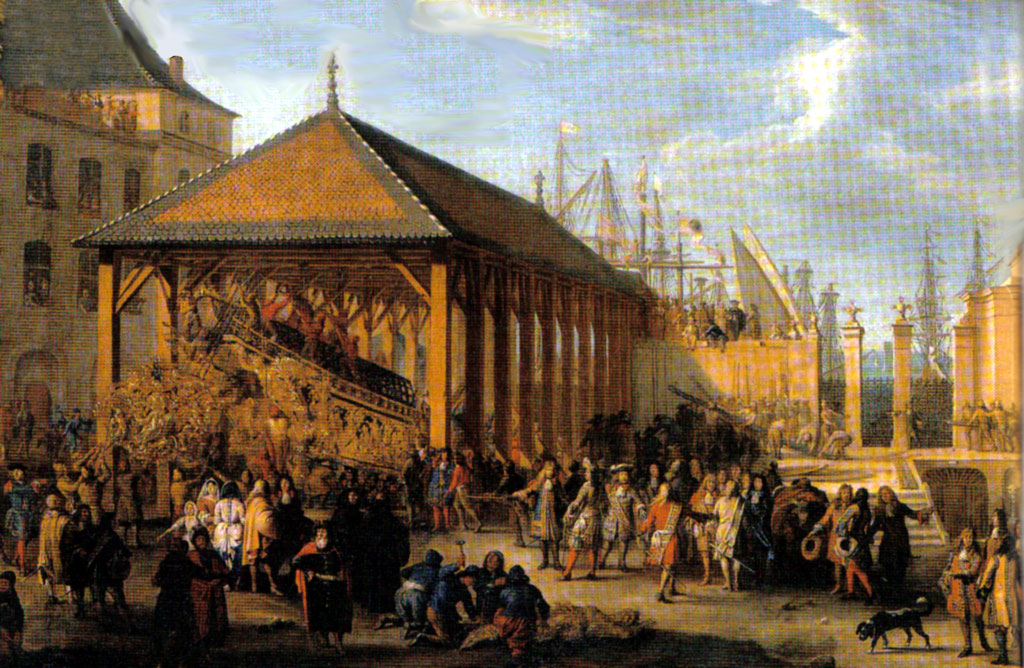
Construction of the La Réale galley at the Marseille Arsenal - Painting circa 1677, attributed to Jean-Baptiste de La Rose

After the decline of the late 17th and early 18th centuries, in 1675, shortly after the death of the galley intendant Nicolas Arnoul, there were 25 galleys in Marseille. This number gradually increased, reaching 30 in 1680 and 40 galleys in 1690, which marked the peak under the reign of Louis XIV. In addition to the units stationed in the Levant, France also had 15 Atlantic galleys, making it the most powerful fleet in Europe. In 1688, Louis XIV had a medal engraved with the motto Assertum maris mediterranei imperium (in Latin) ("Mastery of the Mediterranean Sea is assured").

Although the Galleys no longer had any real role in the navy of the time, they were still a mark of prestige. In 1673, Madame de Sévigné described to her daughter, the Countess of Grignan, "La Réale, working, and the banners and cannon shots". In 1680, the latter, wife of François Adhémar de Monteil, count of Grignan, lieutenant general of the king in Provence, was, as the Mercure Galant recounts, in Marseille, "went to the château d'If on the Réale that Vivonne, general of the Galleys, had armed and was greeted by twenty-six galleys".

The decline that began in the early eighteenth century was inexorable. At the end of the War of the Spanish Succession, the French galleys were no longer in use, and Pierre Arnoul, intendant of the Marseille galleys from 1710 to 1719 and son of Nicolas Arnoul, wrote that he had the grass in the arsenal pulled up for lack of passage, and that he had revived the activity of the workers, having a galley completed and organizing a major tidying-up. From 1719 to 1738, some 15 galleys were built, of which only 6 to 8 were operational. The last galley campaign took place from June 15 to August 7, 1747, under the command of the galley general himself, Jean Philippe d'Orléans, legitimate bastard son of the Regent. The general died the following year at the age of 46, and only two months later, Louis XV signed the ordinance of November 27, 1748, merging all galley personnel into the royal navy.

By 1779, only two galleys remained in Marseille and four in Toulon. Of the two Marseilles galleys, one, the Écarlate, was sold for demolition, while the other, the Ferme, was repaired and sent to Toulon. The latter, the last existing galley, was demolished in 1814.

== Operation of the arsenal ==
=== The chiourme ===
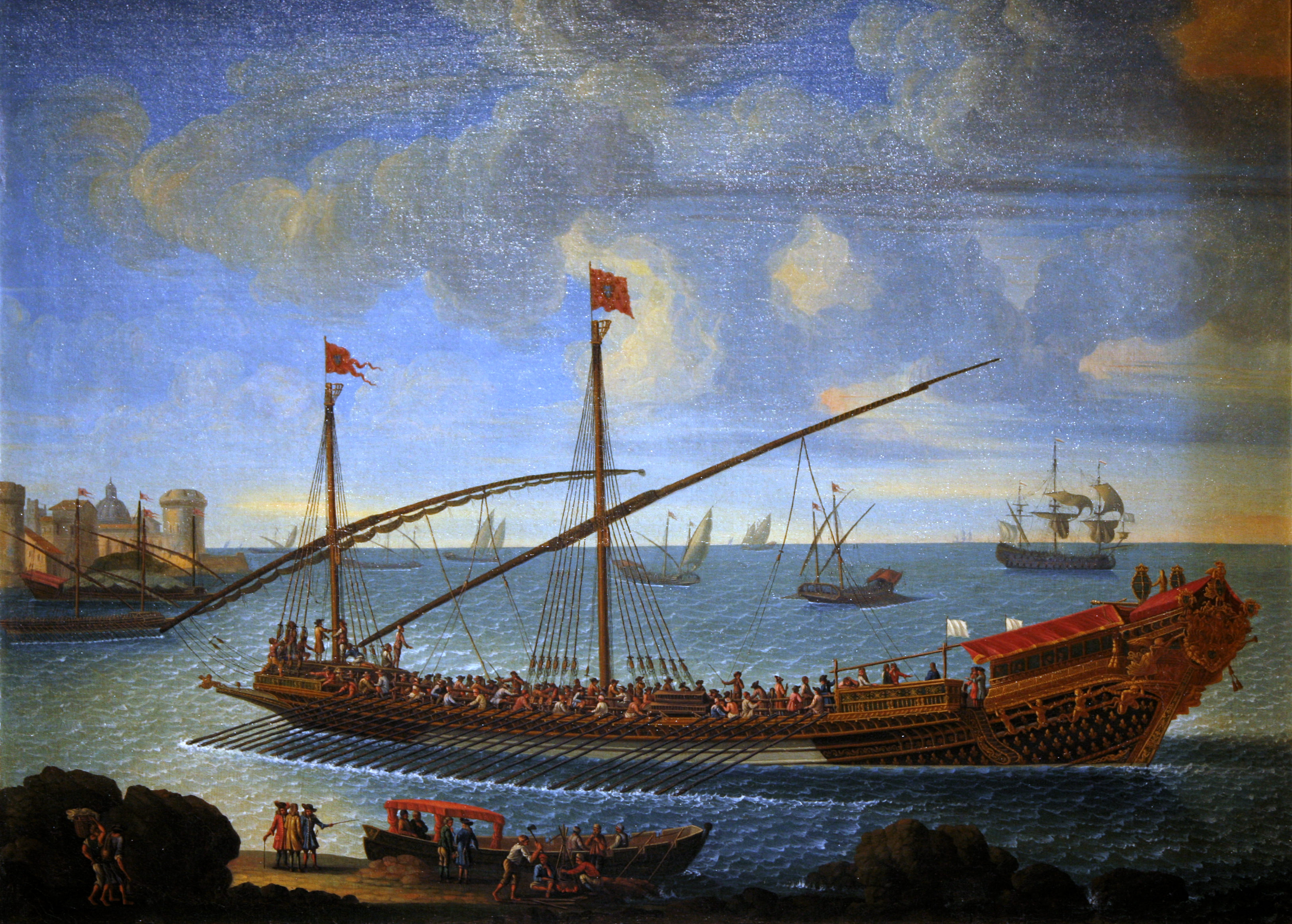
Admiral galley La Réale built in 1679 - Musée de la Marine

Galleys, direct heirs to the Roman triremes, typically Mediterranean military craft, used the chiourme, a group of some 260 rowers, for propulsion.

The chiourme, a group of rowers, is made up of 3 categories of people:

- volunteers who, driven by poverty, signed up to serve on the galleys. The number of such volunteers, or "bénévoglies", was very small and steadily declined over time.
- slaves from North Africa, Greece and Minor Asia, bought by agents on the markets, and known as "Turks". This category accounted for 25% of the workforce in the mid-seventeenth century, but fell steadily to just 10% around 1700.
- The bulk of the workforce was made up of common law convicts, following the creation of the "galley sentence" by Charles IX in 1564. Grouped together in the prisons of the major cities, these convicts were transported to Marseille in convoys or "chains". Although the reasons for conviction varied from period to period, the following figures can be simplified: deserters (39%), salt smugglers or false salt makers (10%), criminals (39%), Protestants (12%).

=== Arsenal management ===
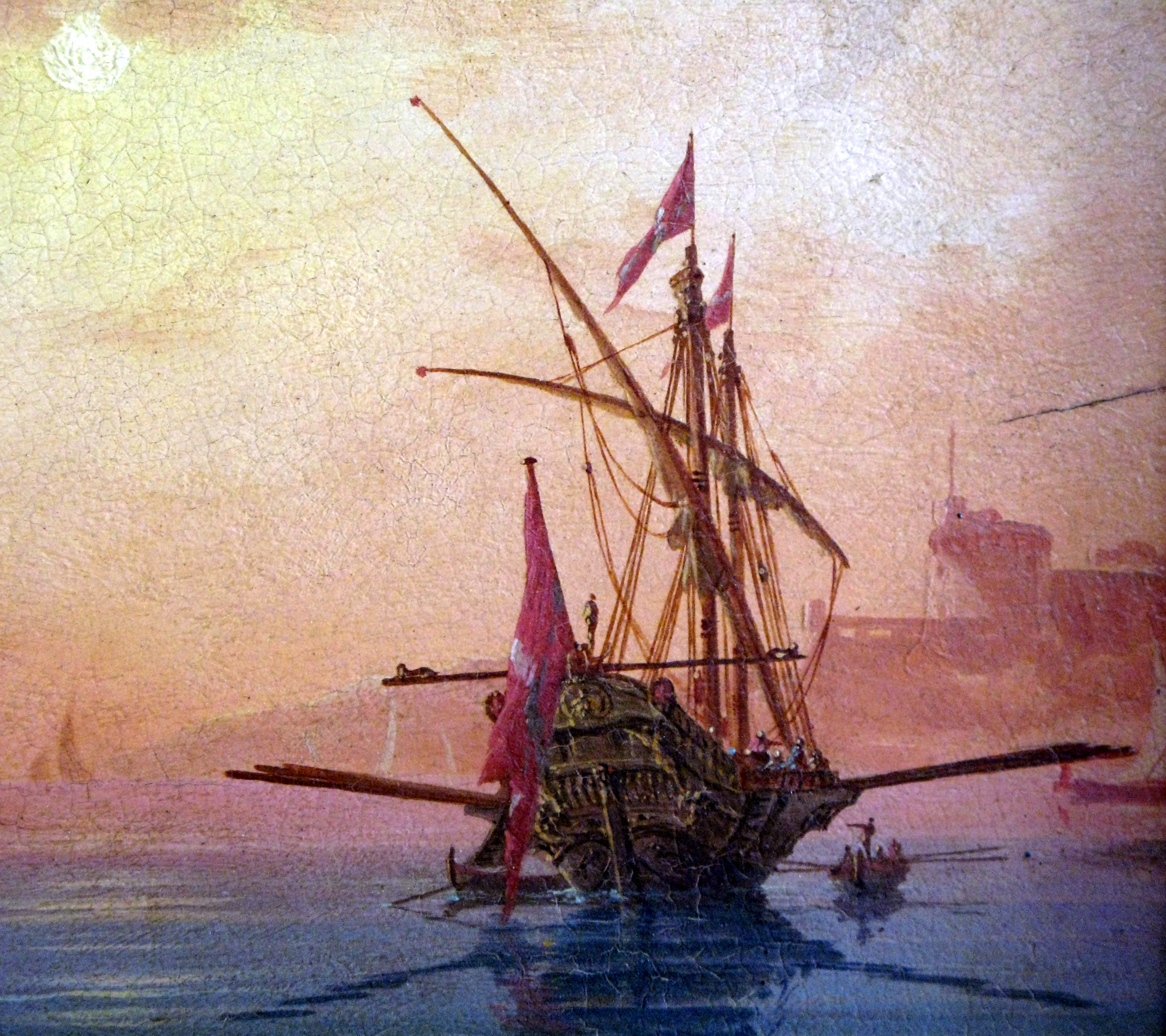
Rear view of a galley of the Order of St. John of Jerusalem in 1765, possibly in the port of Marseille (Marine au soleil couchant (detail), by Charles-François Grenier de Lacroix).

Around 1700, there were an estimated 20,000 people working in the arsenal, including 12,000 galley slaves, 5,000 sailors and soldiers, 1,200 officers and non-commissioned officers, including 200 officiers d'épée (lit. French for sword officer) and 200 officiers de plume (lit. French for pen officer). There were also 300 master builders and journeymen hired on a year-round basis, plus 2,000 to 2,500 irregular seasonal workers and laborers employed to build and maintain the galleys, which required extensive tooling and wood storage. A very large out-of-town population (nearly a quarter of the town's population), all male, resided at the Arsenal.

Many galley slaves moved around the city, especially when the galleys were laid up between October and May. Many found work in the city (blacksmiths, carpenters, locksmiths, etc.). Employers found an abundance of cheap labor. Up to 4,000 men left the Arsenal in the morning, usually in chains under the supervision of a "pertuisanier" (officer armed with a partisan), to return in the evening.

As a result, people and goods were constantly moving back and forth between the arsenal and the city, requiring constant surveillance and rigorous management to prevent escapes and theft of equipment. A precise accounting system was drawn up, with numerous statements and registers recording all entries and exits. The galley intendant's management was audited by the Secretary of State for the Navy, and sanctions could go as far as dismissal, as was the case for Brodart.

=== The galleys and the plague of 1720 ===
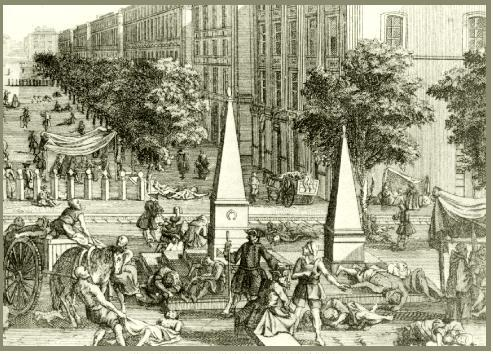
The plague in Marseille in 1720

Well-protected by its walls and isolated from the city, the galley arsenal was little or unaffected by the plague epidemic that ravaged Marseille in 1720. The only convicts to die of the plague were the famous "corbeaux" or gravediggers who, at the request of the aldermen, were charged with removing the corpses to the mass graves. Initially, 23 galley slaves were employed in this task, with the promise of freedom if they escaped the plague. They were replaced by several successive contingents who were placed under the supervision of soldiers. In fact, the convicts looted abandoned houses, killed the dying or threw them into wagons with the dead, or escaped by dressing in the clothes of the dead. It is estimated that 335 convicts died on the job, while 171 escaped death and gained the freedom they had been promised.

== Demolition of the Arsenal ==
On August 2, 1749, Antoine Louis Rouillé, the Secretary of State for the Marine, sent a memorandum to the Intendant de la Tour requesting that all galleys be brought back to Toulon, and that a report be submitted to justify the retention of all galleys in Marseille.

The intendant consulted merchants, who were in favor of keeping the galleys in Marseille, as they were very useful for trade. On January 5, 1750, La Tour sent the Minister a memorandum in line with the wishes of the people of Marseille, which did not prevent the galleys from being transferred to Toulon. The merchants regretted this decision. Such an attitude was surprising, as it could only delay the removal of the cumbersome arsenal. It was no less surprising that the merchants' "cahiers de doléances" (lit. French for list of grievances) in 1789 made no mention of this vital problem. In fact, the overloading of the port of Marseille due to the increase in commercial traffic was all the more noticeable as a whole section of the quays was occupied by the arsenal, and therefore withdrawn from commercial activity. Of the 1,900 linear meters of quay, 500 meters were not used for trading. What's more, the presence of the Arsenal made it impossible to link the two banks open to trade, the north bank (today's Quai du Port) and part of the south bank (today's Quai de Rive Neuve), which could only be reached by boat.

=== Sale of the Arsenal ===
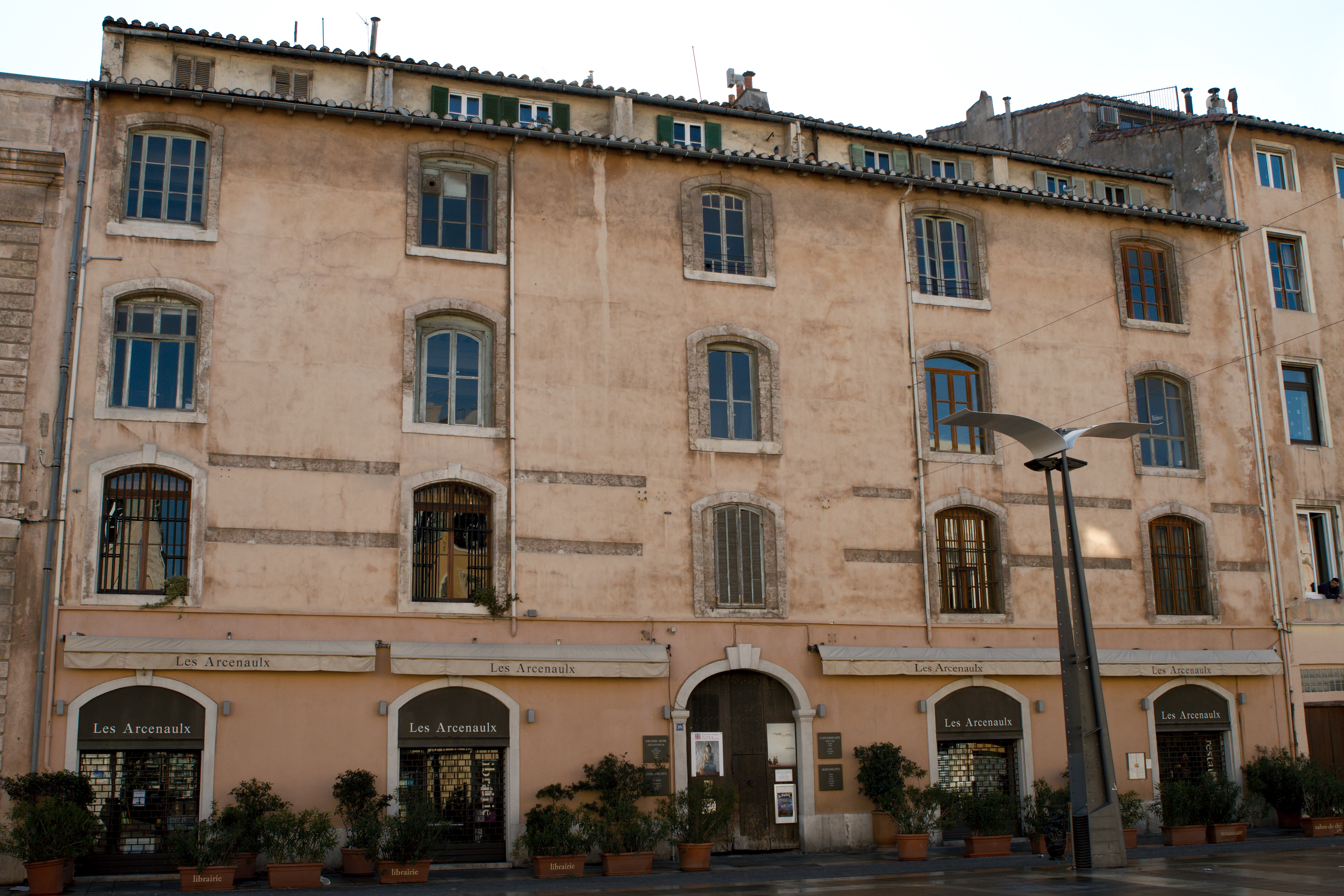
Former headquarters of the Arsenals.

At the beginning of 1781, Pierre-Victor Malouet, naval administrator in Toulon, was asked to propose the disposal of the Arsenal to the city of Marseille. At its meeting of February 11, 1781, the municipal council accepted the principle and appointed a commission chaired by mayor Joachim-Elzéard de Gantel-Guitton, lord of Mazargues, to draw up a report on the conditions of the sale. The city council having accepted the retrocession, the Intendant of Provence, des Gallois de la Tour, acting in the name of the King, sold the land and buildings of the arsenal to the city of Marseille on September 3, 1781, with the condition that the latter build a new district on the land made available. The nature of the work to be carried out was approved by the King on November 12, 1782. Among the various obligations, the city was to build a canal to extend the existing dock and provide a second link to the port. The canal was to be U-shaped and called the Canal de la Douane.

Charles Thiers, secretary-archivist of the city of Marseille and grandfather of Adolphe Thiers, gave his opinion on the development of the available land in a memoir entitled "Avis d'un citoyen pour l'emploi du terrain de l'Arsenal" (lit. French for "Opinion of a citizen on the use of the Arsenal land"). In this text, he demonstrates an urban planning concept that was quite remarkable for its time. He advocated the creation of a large public square and wide streets. Unfortunately, the aldermen followed his recommendations only cautiously, retaining a width of 10 meters for ordinary streets.

The city, unwilling to take on the task of developing the land, decided to retrocede it, and two companies applied: one was founded by Mathieu, procureur de la sénéchaussée de Marseille (in French) ("public prosecutor of the Marseilles seneschal"), associated with the marquis Jean-Baptiste de Rapalli, the other by Rebuffel, former farmer of the Marseille butchers. At its meeting of June 3, 1784, the municipal council sold the land to the first company, which took the name Compagnie de l'Arsenal.

=== Lot subdivision ===
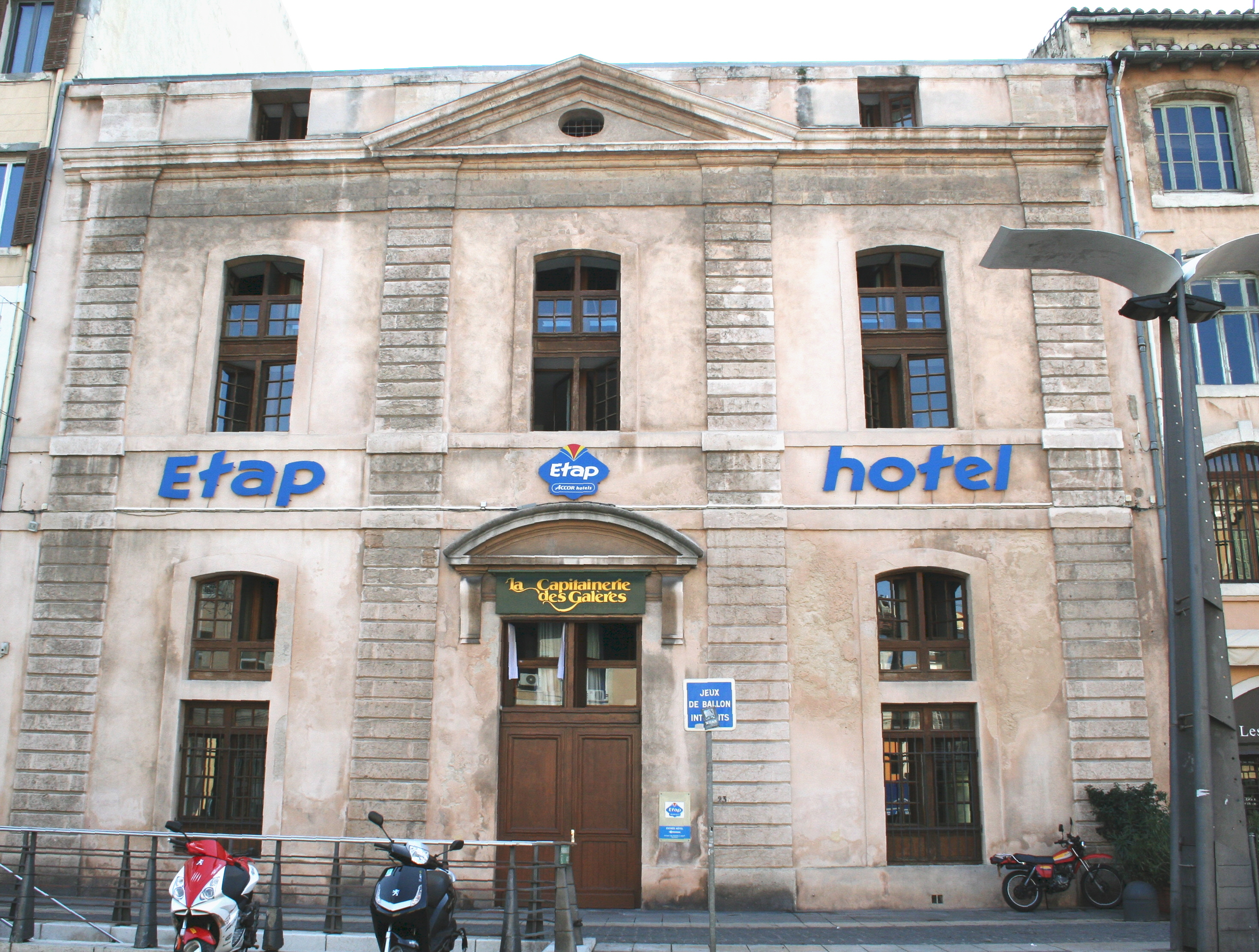
La capitainerie

The freeing up of the land allowed various streets to be extended right down to the port. This was notably the case for the Canebière, whose perspective was blocked by the Arsenal buildings, and which then offered views of the entire port. Rue Pavillon and Rue Vacon were extended and renamed Suffren and Pythéas respectively.

To the south-east of the vacated land, a new square was laid out, then known as Place Ernest Reyer, bordering on the construction of the grand theater, which after its fire in 1919 became the municipal opera house. Rue Beauvau was also opened up.

In the southern part, the Arsenal company modified the original plans by building not an octagonal square but a simple square, today's Place Thiars, in the center of an islet surrounded by the customs canal. Serious difficulties arose in establishing links between this new district, which took the name of îlot Thiars, and the Rue Sainte and Rue du Fort Notre-Dame. When the Arsenal was enlarged, large quantities of rubble had to be removed to create a single-level Arsenal. To connect this Thiars islet to Rue Sainte and Rue du Fort Notre-Dame, the municipal council would have preferred ramps rather than stairs. However, the King's Council decree of February 20, 1786 ordered the construction of the staircases that are currently located on rue Fortia and rue de la Paix to connect with rue Sainte, and on rue Monnier to connect with rue du Fort Notre-Dame.

The last Arsenal buildings were demolished in 1787. When the Revolution broke out in June 1789, all that remained to be done was to pave the streets of the Thiars block.

At the beginning of the 20th century, the Canal de la Douane had a number of drawbacks: bad smells and difficulties linking the two banks. On May 14, 1926, the mayor of Marseille, Siméon Flaissières, passed a resolution requesting the State to empty the canal so that it could be filled in. This was obtained, and the Arsenal canal was filled in with the rubble from the demolition of the buildings behind the Bourse. The new roads (Cours Jean-Ballard, Honoré d'Estienne d'Orves and Place aux huiles) were paved at the beginning of March 1929.

The only remaining vestiges of the Arsenal are a building on cours d'Estienne d'Orves, known as La Capitainerie, which has been listed as a monument historique since August 4, 1978, and, officially, the Mosquée de l'arsenal des galères in Marseille, transferred to the southern part of the city, now at 584 avenue du Prado, listed as a historic monument since July 15, 1965. Research has since cast doubt on the supposed origin of the building, which is in fact a simple Moorish-style kiosk, now converted into a chapel.

== See also ==
- Bagne of Toulon
- Galley

== Bibliography ==
- Arnaud d'Agnel, Gustave (1914). Politique des rois de France en Provence, Louis XI et Charles VIII [Policies of the French kings in Provence, Louis XI and Charles VIII] (in French). Vol. 1. Paris and Marseille: A. Picard et A. Jouvène. OCLC 906290576.
- Fabre, Augustin (1869). Les rues de Marseille [The streets of Marseille] (in French). édition Camoin.
- Bertrand, Régis; Tirone, Lucien (1991). Le guide de Marseille [Marseille guide] (in French). Besançon: la Manufacture. ISBN 978-2-7377-0276-1.
- Bonillo, Jean-Lucien; Borruey, René; Espinas, Jean-Denis; Picon, Antoine (1992). Marseille, ville et port [Marseille, city and port] (in French). Marseille: Parenthèses. ISBN 978-2-86364-060-9. OCLC 716378306.
- Bouyala d’Arnaud, André (1969). Évocation du vieux Marseille [Evocation of old Marseille] (in French). Paris: Les Éditions de Minuit.
- Blès, Adrien (1989). Dictionnaire historique des rues de Marseille : Mémoire de Marseille [Historical dictionary of Marseille streets: memory of Marseille] (in French). Marseille: éditions Jeanne Laffitte. ISBN 978-2-86276-195-4. OCLC 21443673.
- Bouiron, Marc; Tréziny, Henri; Bizot, Bruno; Guilcher, Armelle; Guyon, Jean; Pagni, Mireille (2001). Marseille, trames et paysages urbains de Gyptis au roi René : Actes du colloque international d'archéologie: 3-5 novembre 1999 [Marseille, urban patterns and landscapes from Gyptis to King René: proceedings of the international archaeology symposium: November 3–5, 1999] (in French). Aix-en-Provence: Édisud. ISBN 978-2-7449-0250-5.
- Carrière, Charles (1973). Négociants marseillais au 18th century, contribution à l'étude des économies maritimes [Marseilles merchants in the 18th century, a contribution to the study of maritime economies] (in French). Marseille: Institut historique de Provence. p. 166.
- Carrière, Charles; Rebuffat, Ferréol; Coudurié, Marcel (2016). Marseille ville morte, la peste de 1720 [Marseille, a dead city, the plague of 1720] (in French). Marseille: éditions Jeanne Laffitte. p. 166. ISBN 978-2-86276-521-1.
- Duchêne, Roger; Contrucci, Jean (1998). Marseille : 2600 ans d'histoire [Marseille: 2600 years of history] (in French). Paris: Librairie Arthème Fayard. ISBN 978-2-213-60197-7.
- Masson, Paul. Encyclopédie départementale des Bouches-du-Rhône [Bouches-du-Rhône departmental encyclopedia] (in French). Marseille: Archives départementales des Bouches-du-Rhône.
- Masson, Paul (1911). Histoire du commerce français dans le Levant au XVIIIe siècle [History of French trade in the Levant in the 18th century.] (in French). Paris: Hachette.
- Masson, Paul (1938). Les Galères de France (1481-1781), Marseille, port de guerre [French Galleys (1481-1781), Marseille, port of war] (in French). Paris: Hachette.
- Crémieux, Adolphe (1917). Marseille et la royauté pendant la minorité de Louis XIV (1643-1660) [Marseille and royalty during the minority of Louis XIV (1643-1660)] (in French). Paris: Hachette.
- Rambert, Gaston (1934). Marseille, la formation d'une grande cité moderne [Marseille, the birth of a great modern city] (in French). Marseille: Impr.-édit. du "Sémaphore".
- Rambert, Gaston (1931). Nicolas Arnoul, intendant des galères à Marseille (1665-1674), ses lettres et mémoires relatifs à l'agrandissement de la ville et à l'entretien du port [Nicolas Arnoul, Intendant of the galleys in Marseille (1665-1674), his letters and memoirs concerning the city's expansion and port maintenance] (in French). Marseille: Les éditions de Provincia.
- Gallocher, Pierre (1995). Zigzags dans le passé [Zigzags through the past] (in French). Vol. 4. Marseille: P. Tacussel. ISBN 9782903963828. OCLC 463860963.
- Villiers, Patrick (2019). Ancre (ed.). Les Saint-Philippe et les vaisseaux de 1ère rang de Louis XIII à Louis XIV [Saint-Philippe and 1st rank ships from Louis XIII to Louis XIV] (in French). Nice. ISBN 979-10-96873-44-9.
- Zysberg, André (1983). Marseille au temps des galères : 1660-1748 [Marseille at the time of the galleys: 1660-1748] (in French). Marseille: édition Rivages. ISBN 978-2-903059-26-2.
- Zysberg, André (1987). Les Galériens, vies et destins de 60000 forçats sur les galères de France 1680-1748 [The Galley slaves, lives and destinies of 60,000 convicts on the galleys of France 1680-1748] (in French). Paris: éditions du Seuil. ISBN 978-2-02-009753-6.
- Zysberg, André (2007). Marseille au temps du Roi-Soleil, la ville, les galères, l'arsenal [Marseille at the time of the Sun King: the city, the galleys, the arsenal] (in French). Marseille: éditions Jeanne Laffitte. ISBN 978-2-86276-409-2.
- Zysberg, André (1980). "Marseille cité des galères à l'âge classique" [Marseille, city of galleys in the classical age]. Revue municipale de Marseille (in French) (122).
