= Jeff Eggers =

Jeffrey Eggers
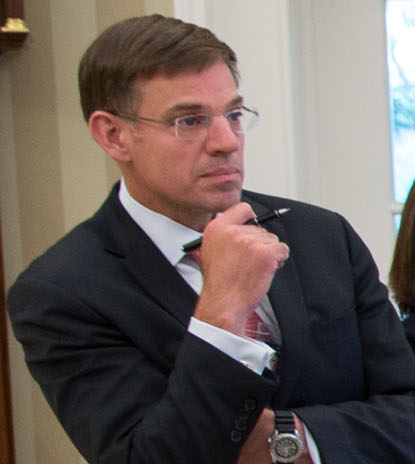
- Jeff Eggers in 2013
- Education: Oxford University(M.A.); United States Naval Academy (B.S)
- Military career
- Allegiance: United States of America
- Branch: United States Navy
- Service years: 1993-2013
- Rank: Commander (O-5)
- Unit: Navy SEALs
- Awards: Samuel Nelson Drew Award

Jeffrey William Eggers served in the White House for six years, most recently as President Obama's special assistant for national security affairs. Eggers retired from the Navy in 2013 after a twenty-year career as a U.S. Navy SEAL. His many operational tours included several SEAL Teams, commander of the Special Operations Task Unit in western Iraq, and operations officer and mission commander for the U.S. Navy's undersea special operations command. From his time as a SEAL, he has extensive combat and leadership experience. Eggers also served as the National Security Council's senior director for Afghanistan and Pakistan for four years.

He currently leads the McChrystal Group's Leadership Institute, a leadership consulting firm whose main goal is to improve the performance of organizations. Eggers is also a senior fellow in New America's International Security program, where he researches policy making in the public sector, focusing specifically on the behavioral science behind decision making. Eggers is a speaker exclusively represented by Leading Authorities speakers bureau, and utilizes his extensive experience to discuss politics and leadership, as well as how our notion of leadership in America needs to change. Eggers is currently on the board of a non-profit that helps families of veterans who were killed in action. He is also a member of the NationSwell Council, which is a group the focuses on solutions to critical challenges in America. He also researches behavioral science, and has many publications, including ones in Fortune, Politico, and U.S. News & World Report. Eggers has taught courses in change management and leadership for U.S. intelligence agencies, the Foreign Service Institute, and the Johns Hopkins School of Advanced International Studies.

== Education ==
Eggers has an MA from Oxford University and a BS from the United States Naval Academy.

== Books ==
- McChrystal, Stanley; Eggers, Jeff; Mangone, Jay (2018). Leaders: Myth and Reality. Portfolio.

== Other groups ==
- Co-founder and Managing Partner at Rsquared VC
- Senior fellow at the New America Foundation
- Advisor for the Centre for Humanitarian Dialogue
- Member of the NationSwell Council
- Board member of the Special Operations Fund, a non-profit that cares for and assists the families of special operations veterans killed in action

== Awards and honors ==
- In 2014, Eggers received the Samuel Nelson Drew Award for “distinguished contributions in pursuit of global peace” from President Obama for mediating the political crisis that followed the 2014 Afghan presidential elections.
