= Matthias Eggers =

German politician (born 1985)

Member of the Landtag of North Rhine-Westphalia
- Incumbent
- Assumed office 1 June 2022
- Preceded by: Marco Voge
- Constituency: Märkischer Kreis II

Personal details
- Born: 28 November 1985 (age 40)
- Party: Christian Democratic Union (since 2002)

Matthias Eggers (born 28 November 1985) is a German politician serving as a member of the Landtag of North Rhine-Westphalia since 2022. He has served as deputy chairman of the Christian Democratic Union in the Märkischer Kreis since 2014.
