= Jean-Baptiste de La Rose =

French painter (1612–1687)

Jean-Baptiste de La Rose (1612–1687) was a French painter and draughtsman, specialising in decorating ships and producing paintings of ships and seascapes. His son Pascal de La Rose was also a painter.

== Life ==
He was born in Marseille, whither his Paris-born father had moved and married. Initially a soldier de La Rose was wounded in the siege of Casal in 1630.

He was apprenticed to the painter François Mimault between 28 May 1631 and 7 December 1638. He became a painter in his own right and worked on the decoration of a vessel at Toulon in 1646. Jules Mazarin visited his studio in Marseille in 1660 and commissioned a major painting from him for Louis XIV.

In 1663 he was put in charge of all painting work in the port of Toulon and given the title "maître peintre entretenu". He painted seascapes which became much in demand at the French court by figures such as Beaufort, Colbert, Seignelay, d'Estrées and Tourville. His paintings were also highly praised by Charles Le Brun and François de Troy and he was a major influence on Jean-Joseph Kapeller. He died in Toulon.

== Selected works in public collections ==
- Marseille, musée de la Marine :
  - The Port of La Ciotat in 1664;
  - View of the Port of Marseille, 1666
- Tatihou, musée maritime : Scene in a Mediterranean Port
- Versailles, château de Versailles : The Marquis de Seignelay and the duc de Vivonne visiting the royal gallery in the arsenal at Marseille around 1677

== Gallery ==
Works by Jean-Baptiste de La Rose

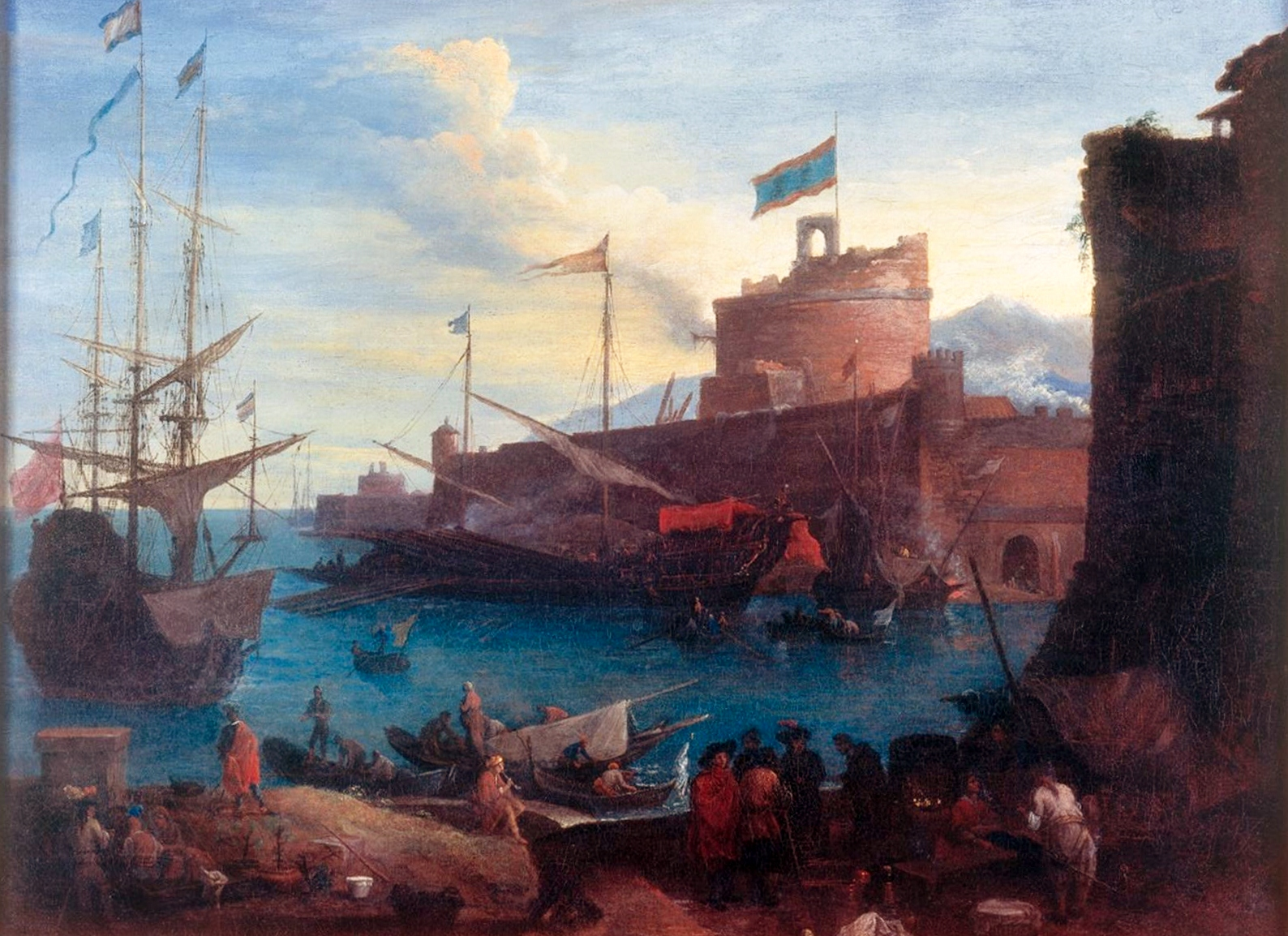
View of a Mediterranean Port, musée maritime de l'île Tatihou.

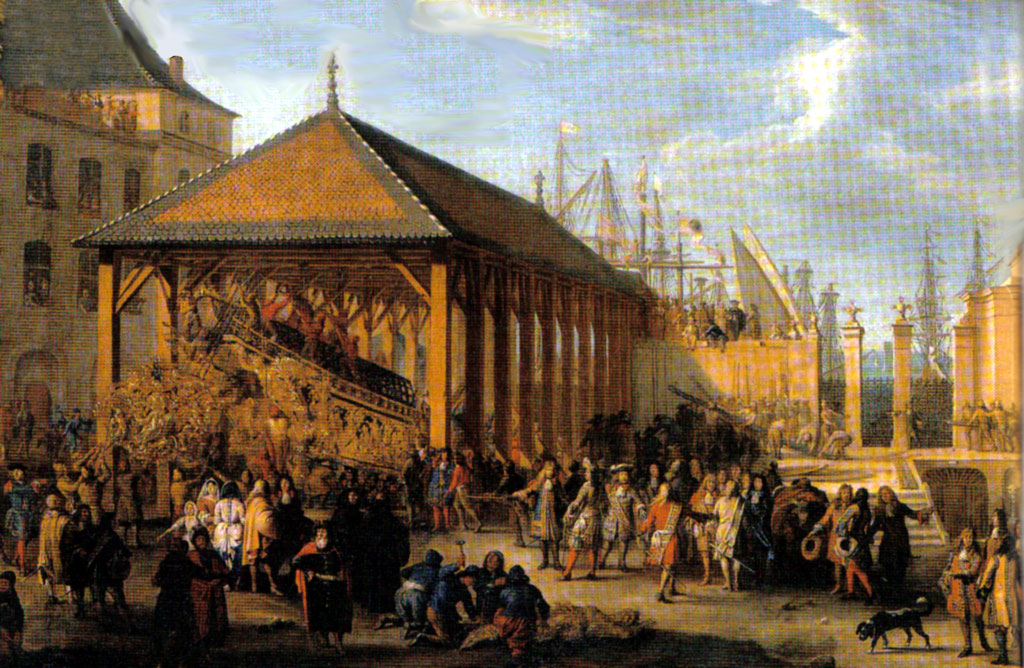
The Marquis de Seignelay and the duc de Vivonne visiting the royal gallery in the arsenal at Marseille around 1677, château de Versailles.
