= Markus Egger (footballer) =

Austrian footballer

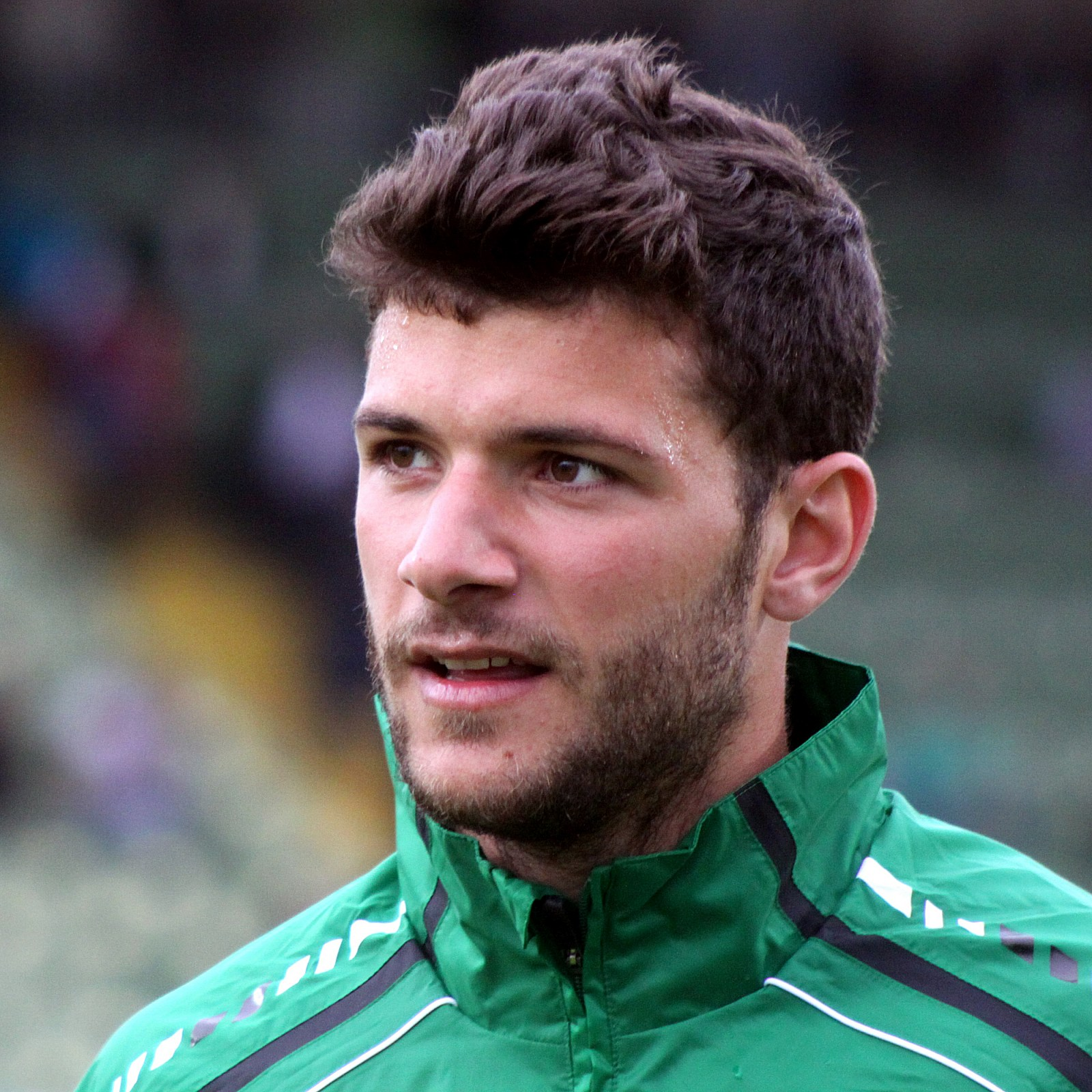

Personal information
- Full name: Markus Egger
- Date of birth: 15 January 1990 (age 36)
- Place of birth: Austria
- Height: 1.89 m (6 ft 2 1/2 in)
- Position: Goalkeeper

Team information
- Current team: SV Völs

Youth career
- AKA Tirol

Senior career*
Years	Team	Apps	(Gls)
2007–2011	WSG Wattens	71	(1)
2011–2013	Wacker Innsbruck	8	(0)
2013–	SV Völs		
- * Club domestic league appearances and goals as of 21 July 2013 (UTC)

Markus Egger (born 15 January 1990) is an Austrian footballer who plays for SV Völs.
