= René Egger =

French architect (1915–2016)

- Born: René Albert Antoine Marie Egger; 14 September 1915; Marseille, France
- Died: 17 February 2016 (aged 100); Marseille, France
- Education: Beaux-Arts de Paris
- Occupation: Architect

René Albert Antoine Marie Egger (14 September 1915 – 17 February 2016) was a French modernist architect. He worked with Fernand Pouillon from 1944 to 1953. Over the course of his career, he designed many buildings in Marseille, including more than 150 university and school buildings. He also designed the Hôpital Nord, known as "Europe's most modern" hospital when its construction was completed in 1959.
