= List of châteaux in Provence-Alpes-Côte d'Azur =

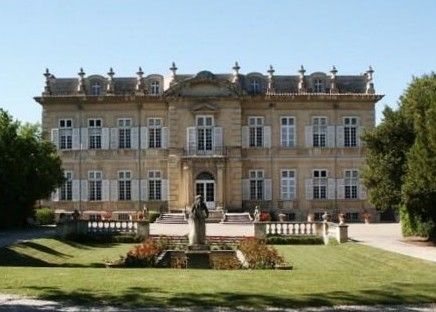
Château de Barbentane in Barbentane

This is a list of châteaux in Provence-Alpes-Côte d'Azur, France.

== Alpes-de-Haute-Provence ==
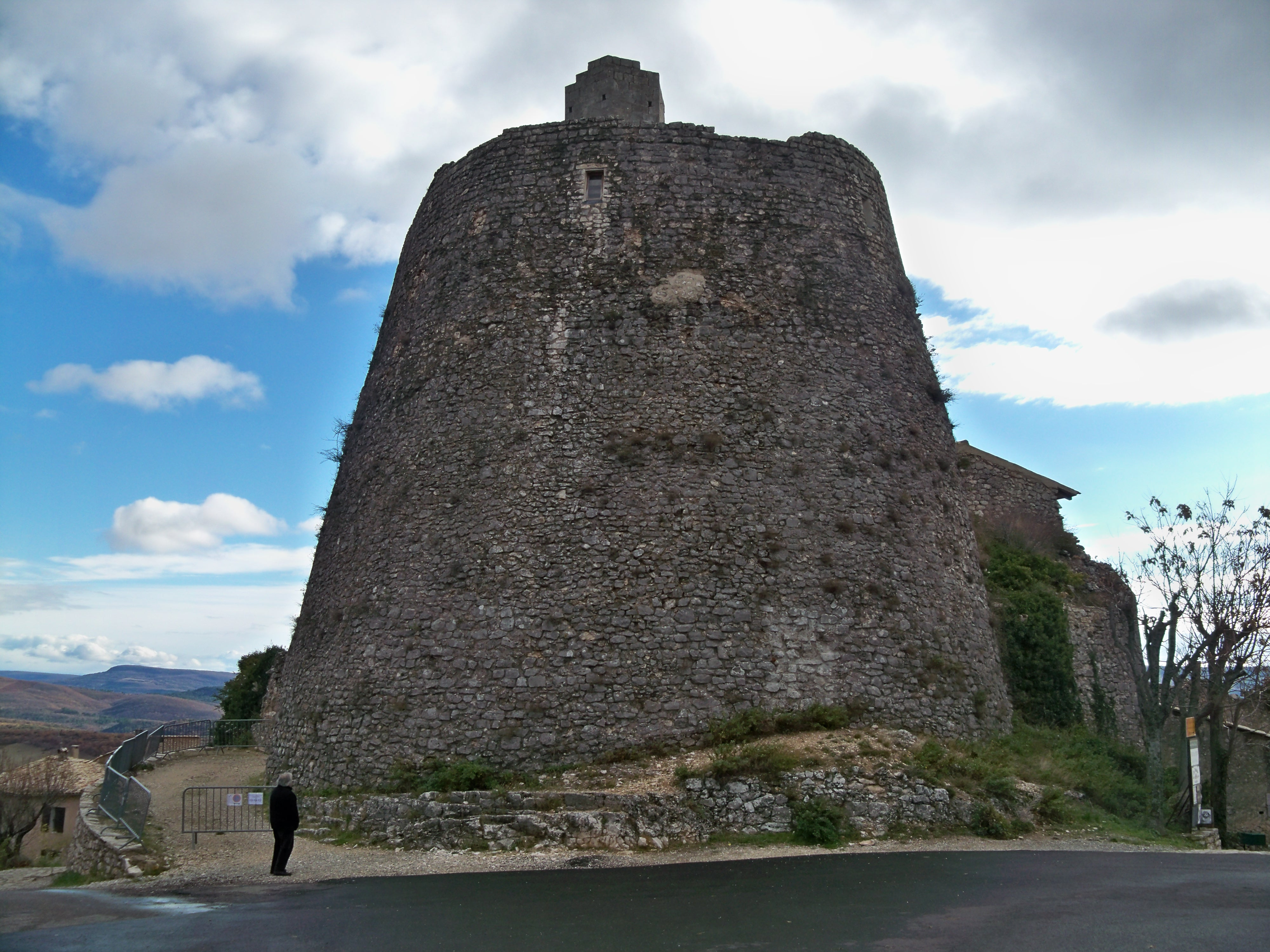
The rotunda of the Château de Simiane

- Château d'Allemagne-en-Provence in Allemagne-en-Provence
- Château de Castellane in Castellane
- Château de la Gabelle in Ferrassières
- Château de Gréoux-les-Bains in Gréoux-les-Bains
- Château de Sauvan in Mane
- Château de Simiane-la-Rotonde in Simiane-la-Rotonde
- Citadelle de Sisteron in Sisteron
- Château des Magnans in Jausiers
- Villa Costebelle in Barcelonnette

== Alpes-Maritimes ==
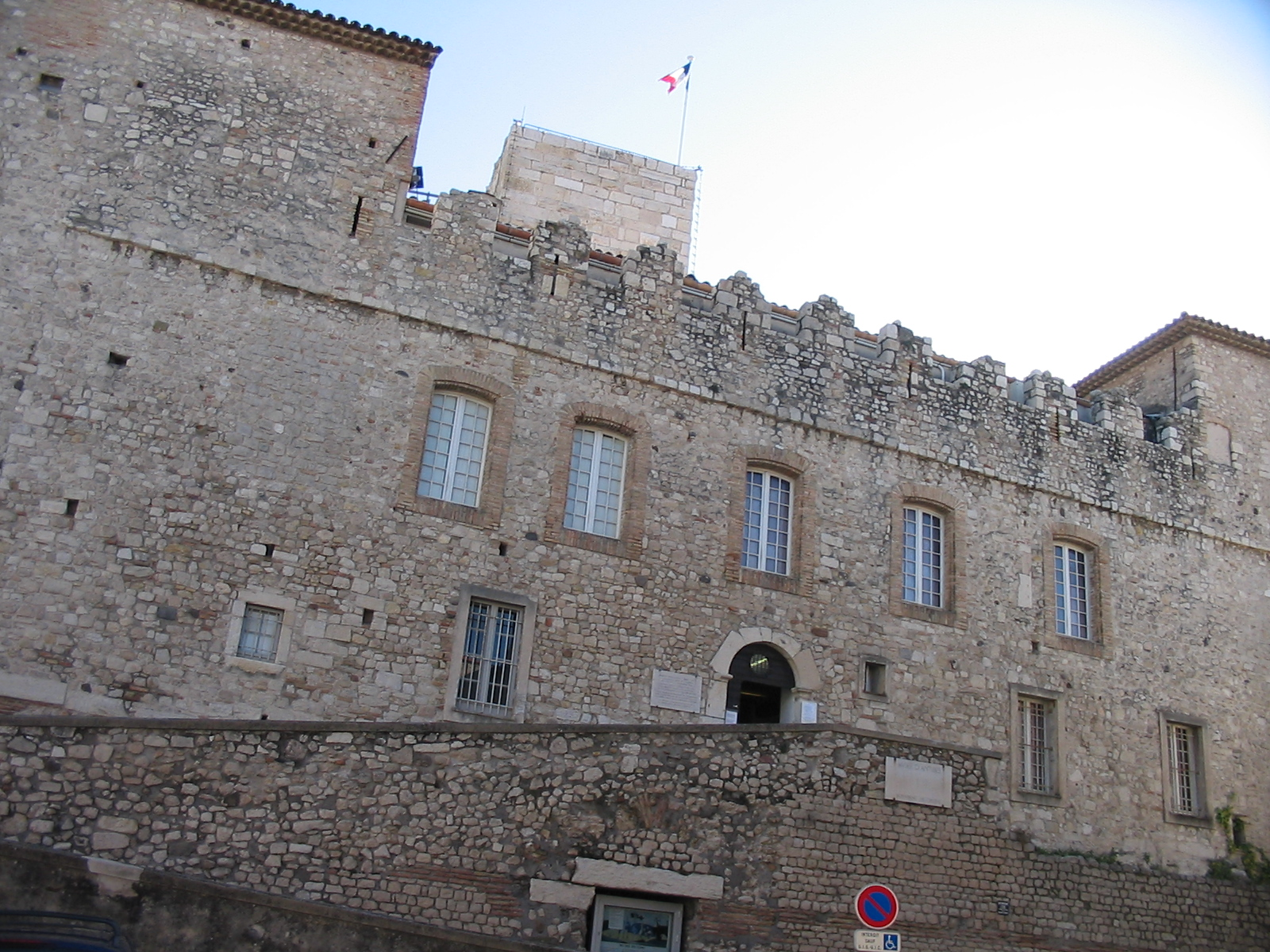
Picasso museum at the Château d'Antibes

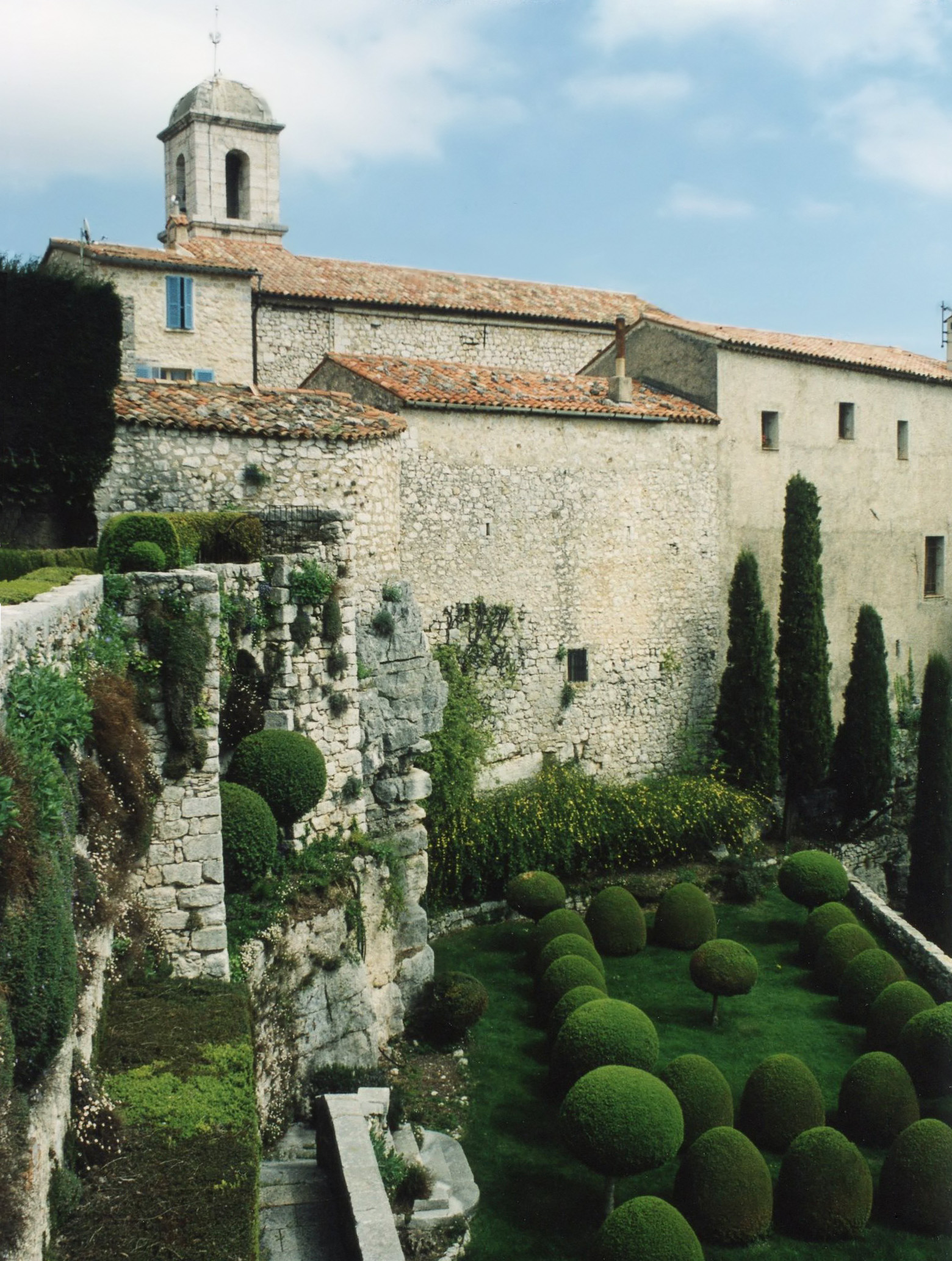
Château de Gourdon

- Château d'Antibes, in Antibes
- Château de Cagnes-sur-Mer, in Cagnes-sur-Mer
- Château de Cannes, in Cannes
- Château de Carros, in Carros
- Château de Castellaras, in Mouans-Sartoux
- Château de Crémat, in Nice
- Palais des Ducs de Savoie, in Nice
- Château d'Èze, in Èze
- Château de Gourdon, in Gourdon
- Palais Lascaris, in Nice
- Château de la Napoule, in La Napoule
- Château de Nice, in Nice
- Château de Roquebrune-Cap-Martin, in Roquebrune-Cap-Martin
- Château de Roquefort, in Roquefort-les-Pins
- Château Saint-Jeannet, in Saint-Jeannet
- Château de Vaugrenier, in Villeneuve-Loubet
- Château de Villeneuve, in Vence
- Château de Villeneuve-Loubet, in Villeneuve-Loubet
- Citadelle Saint-Elme, in Villefranche-sur-Mer

== Bouches-du-Rhône ==
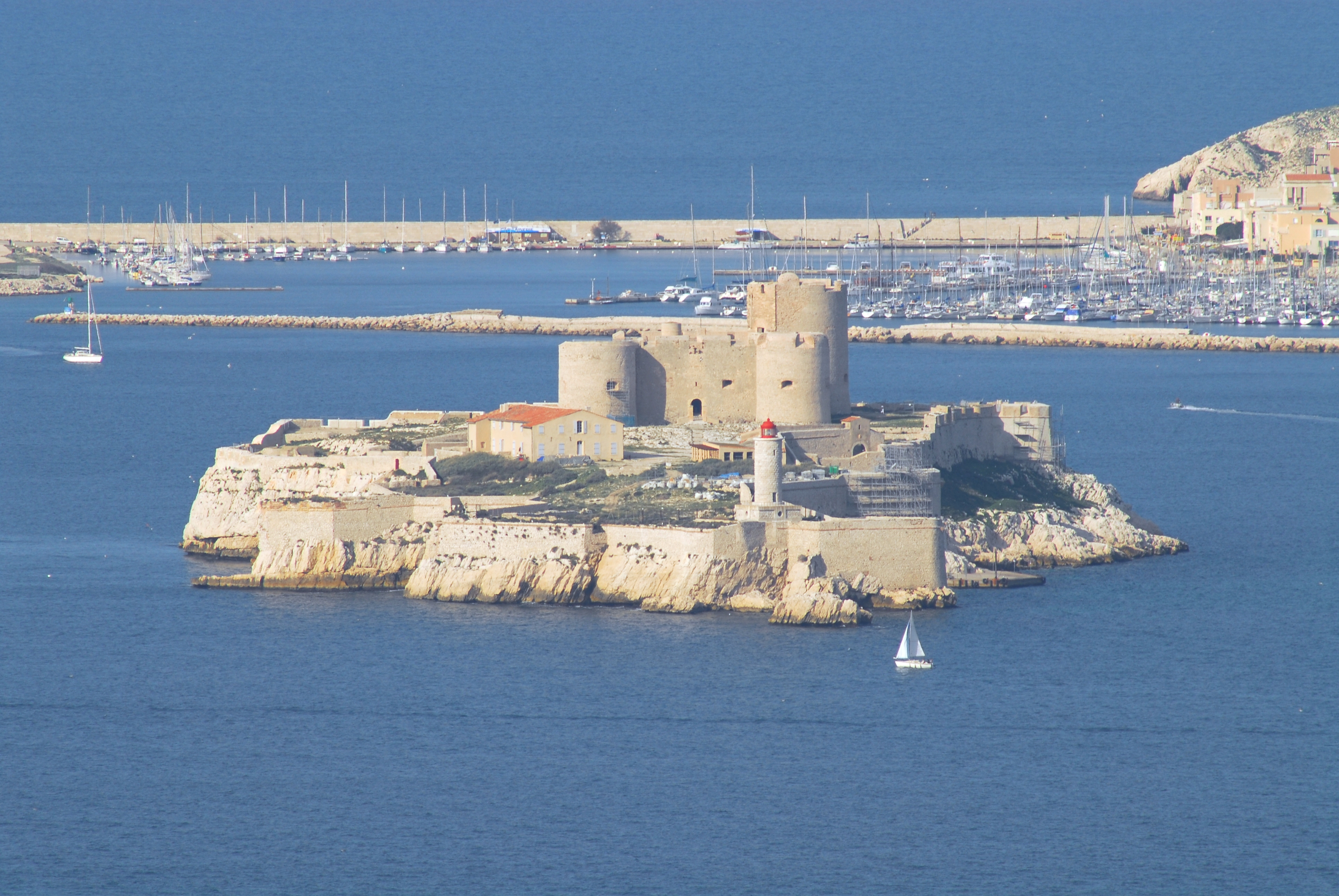
Château d'If in Marseille

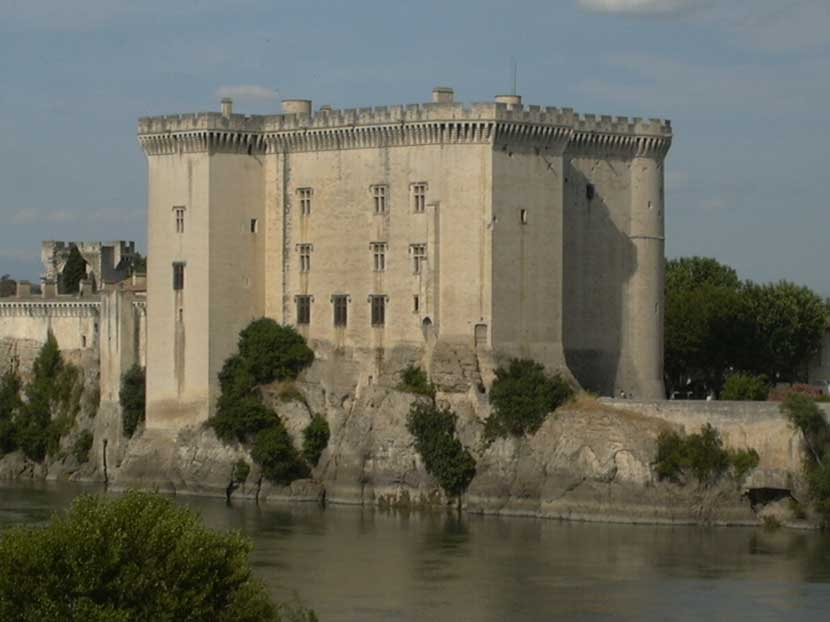
Château de Tarascon in Tarascon

- Château de la Barben, in La Barben
- Château de Barbentane in Barbentane
- Château des Baux, in Baux-de-Provence
- Château de Boulbon, in Boulbon
- Château de la Buzine, in Marseille
- Chateau de Bruni in Berre-l'Étang
- Château des Creissauds, in Aubagne
- Château de l'Empéri, in Salon-de-Provence
- Château d'If, in Marseille
- Château de Marignane, in Marignane
- Château de Ners, in Allauch
- Château de Puyricard, in Aix-en-Provence
- Château de Pélissanne in Pélissanne
- Fort Saint-Jean, in Marseille
- Fort Saint-Nicolas, in Marseille
- Château de Saint-Rémy-de-Provence, in Saint-Rémy-de-Provence
- Château de Tarascon, in Tarascon

== Hautes-Alpes ==
- Château d'Ancelle in Ancelle
- Château d'Embrun, in Embrun
- Château de Lesdiguières, in Glaizil
- Château de Laragne-Montéglin, in Laragne-Montéglin
- Place forte de Mont-Dauphin, in Mont-Dauphin
- Château de Montorcier, in Saint-Jean-Saint-Nicolas
- Château de Saint-Firmin, in Saint-Firmin
- Château de Tallard, in Tallard

== Var ==
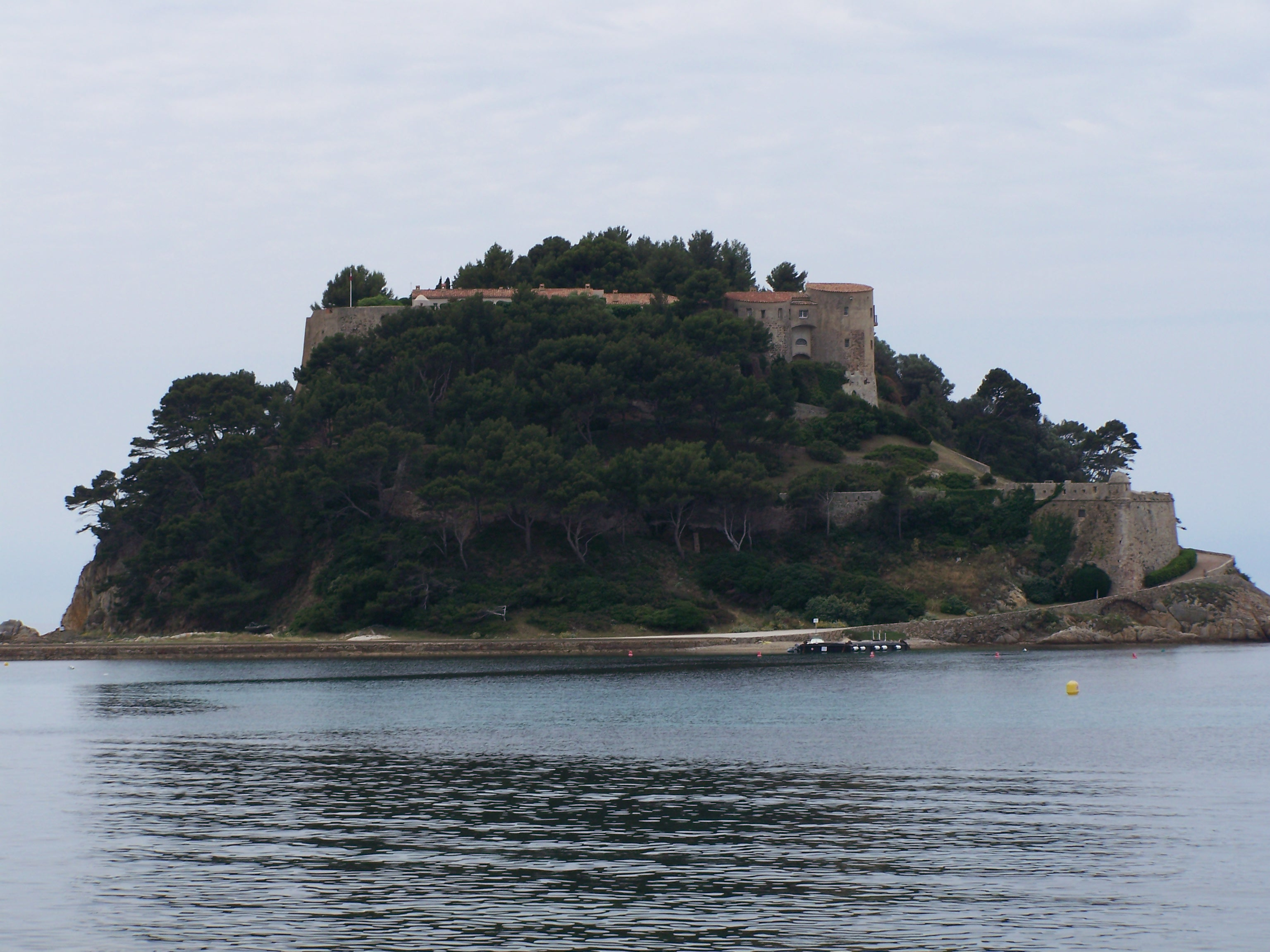
Fort de Brégançon

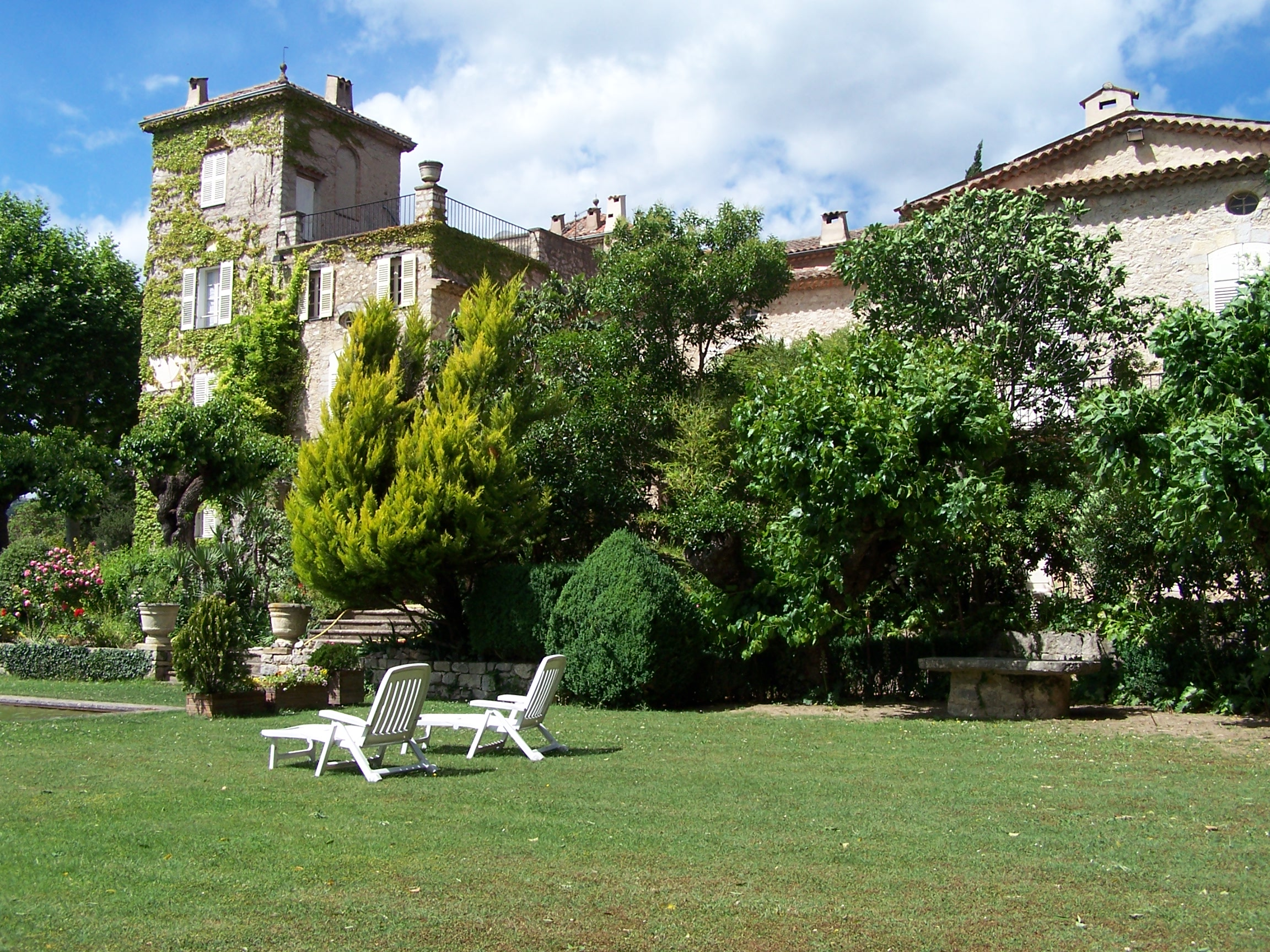
Château de La Colle Noire

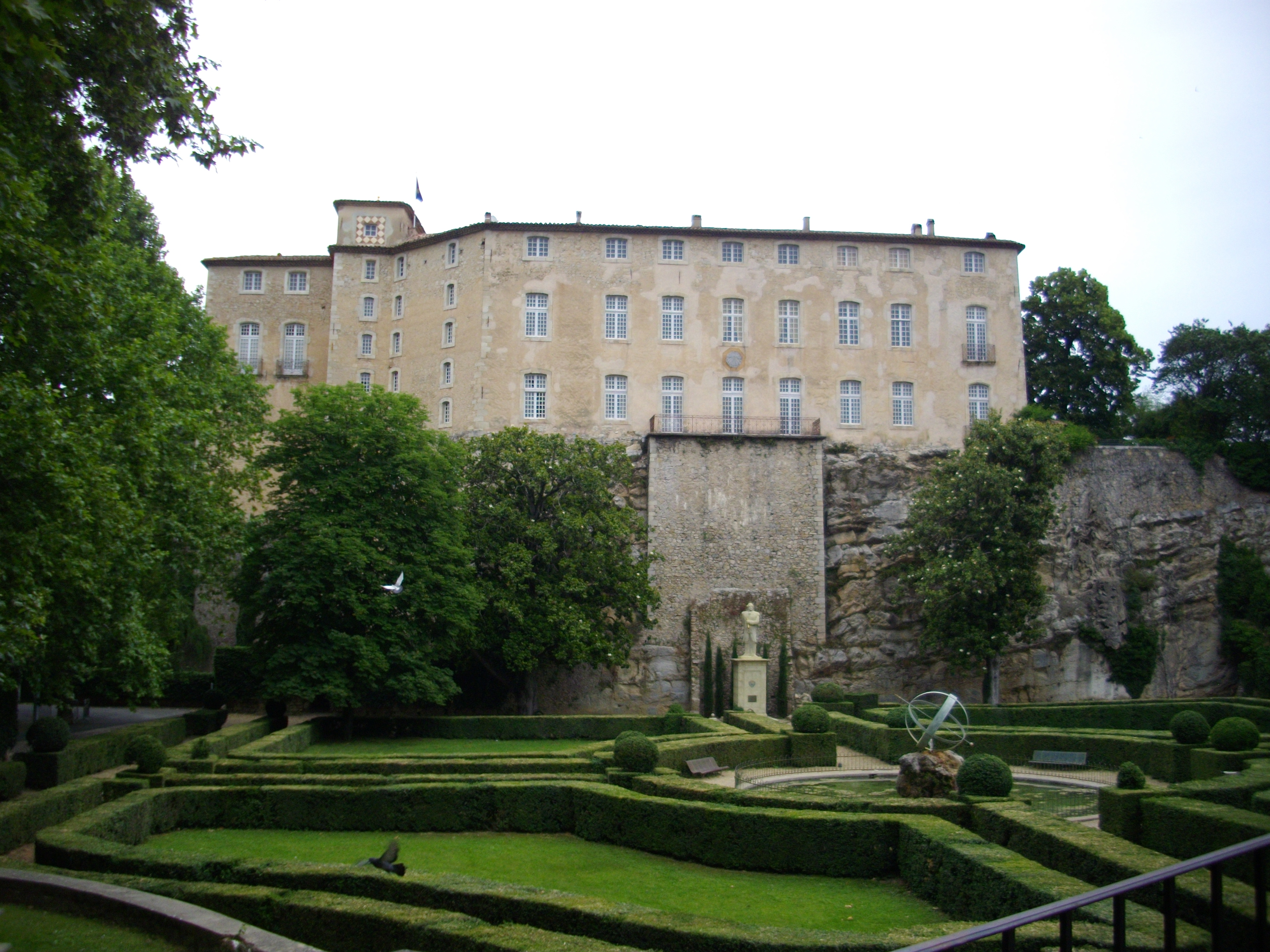
Château d'Entrecasteaux and park

- Château d'Agay, in Saint-Raphaël
- Château d'Aiguines, in Aiguines
- Château Aurélien, in Fréjus
- Château de Bargème, in Bargème
- Fort de Brégançon, in Bormes-les-Mimosas
- Château du Castelet, in Castellet
- Château Castel-Ombre, in Ollioules
- Château de La Colle Noire or Château Dior, in Montauroux
- Château d'Entrecasteaux, in Entrecasteaux
- Château d'Évenos, in Évenos
- Château de Fabrègues, in Aups
- Castelas de Forcalqueiret, in Forcalqueiret
- Château de Giens, in Hyères
- Château de Hyères, in Hyères
- Château de La Tourelle, in Ollioules
- Château Marguerite, in Ollioules
- Château de Montauban, in Ollioules
- Château de Montfort-sur-Argens, in Montfort-sur-Argens
- Château féodal d'Ollioules, in Ollioules
- Second Château d'Ollioules, in Ollioules
- Château Raphélis, in Tourtour
- Château de Pontevès, in Pontevès (→en)
- Château Sainte-Anne in Évenos
- Fort de Saint-Tropez, in Saint-Tropez
- Château de Taurenne, in Aups
- Château de Thoron, in Artignosc-sur-Verdon
- Château Vallon, in Ollioules
- Château de Vérignon, in Vérignon
- Château de Villepey, in Fréjus
- Château de Vins-sur-Caramy, in Vins-sur-Caramy
- Palais des Comtes de Provence, in Brignoles

== Vaucluse ==
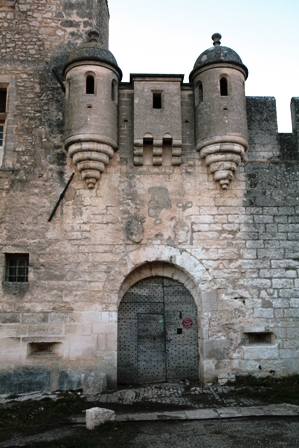
Château de Javon

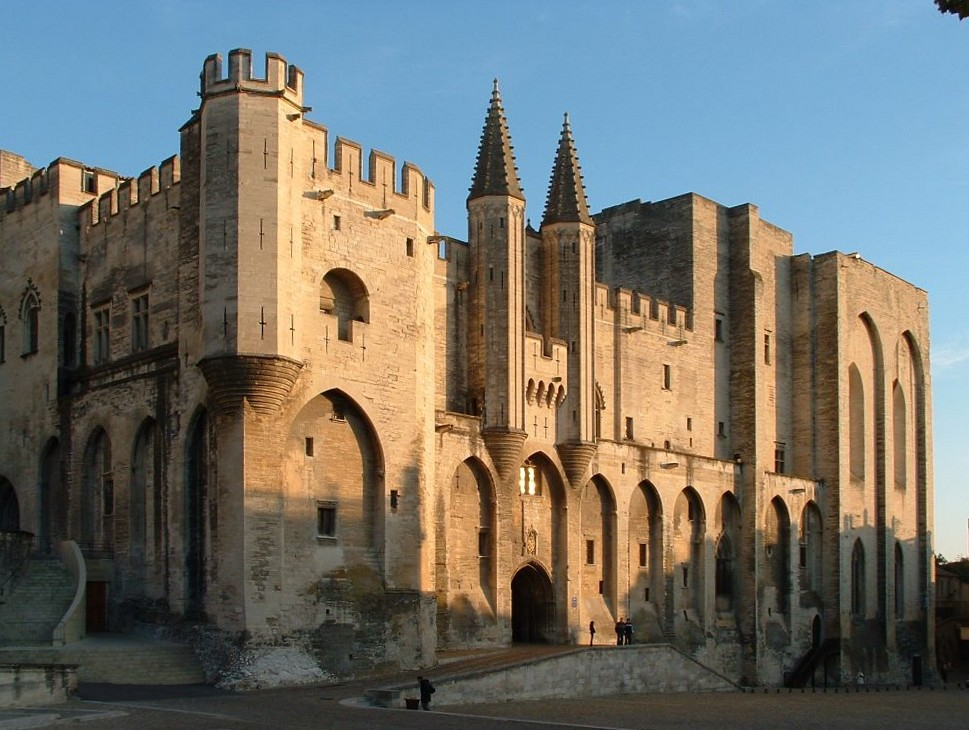
Palais des Papes in Avignon

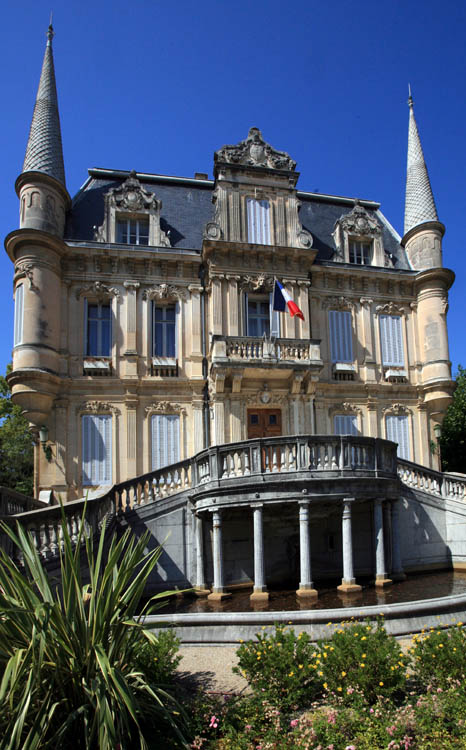
Château de Val-Seille

- Château d'Anselme, in Pernes-les-Fontaines
- Château d'Ansouis, in Ansouis
- Château du Barroux, in Barroux
- Château de Cabrières-d'Avignon, in Cabrières-d'Avignon
- Château d'Entrechaux, in Entrechaux
- Château l'Ermitage in Pernes-les-Fontaines
- Château de Gordes, in Gordes
- Château de Javon, in Lioux
- Château de Lacoste, in Lacoste
- Chateau de lioux, in Lioux
- Château de Lourmarin, in Lourmarin
- Château du Martinet, in Mazan
- Château de Mirabeau, in Mirabeau
- Château de Mondragon, in Mondragon
- Château de Mornas, in Mornas
- Château de Murs, in Murs
- Château la Nerthe, in Châteauneuf-du-Pape
- Palais des Papes, in Avignon
- Château de Pétrarque, in Fontaine-de-Vaucluse
- Château Saint-Joseph or Château des trois fontaines in Pernes-les-Fontaines
- Château Saint-Lambert, in Lioux
- Château de Saumane, in Saumane-de-Vaucluse
- Château de Thouzon, in Thor
- Château d'Uchaux, in Uchaux
- Château de Vaison-la-Romaine, in Vaison-la-Romaine
- Château de Val-Seille, in Courthézon

== See also ==
- List of castles in France
- Châteaux of the Loire Valley

== Notes and references ==
Media related to Castles in Provence-Alpes-Côte d'Azur at Wikimedia Commons
