= Bollène =

Commune in France

Bollène Bouleno
- Commune
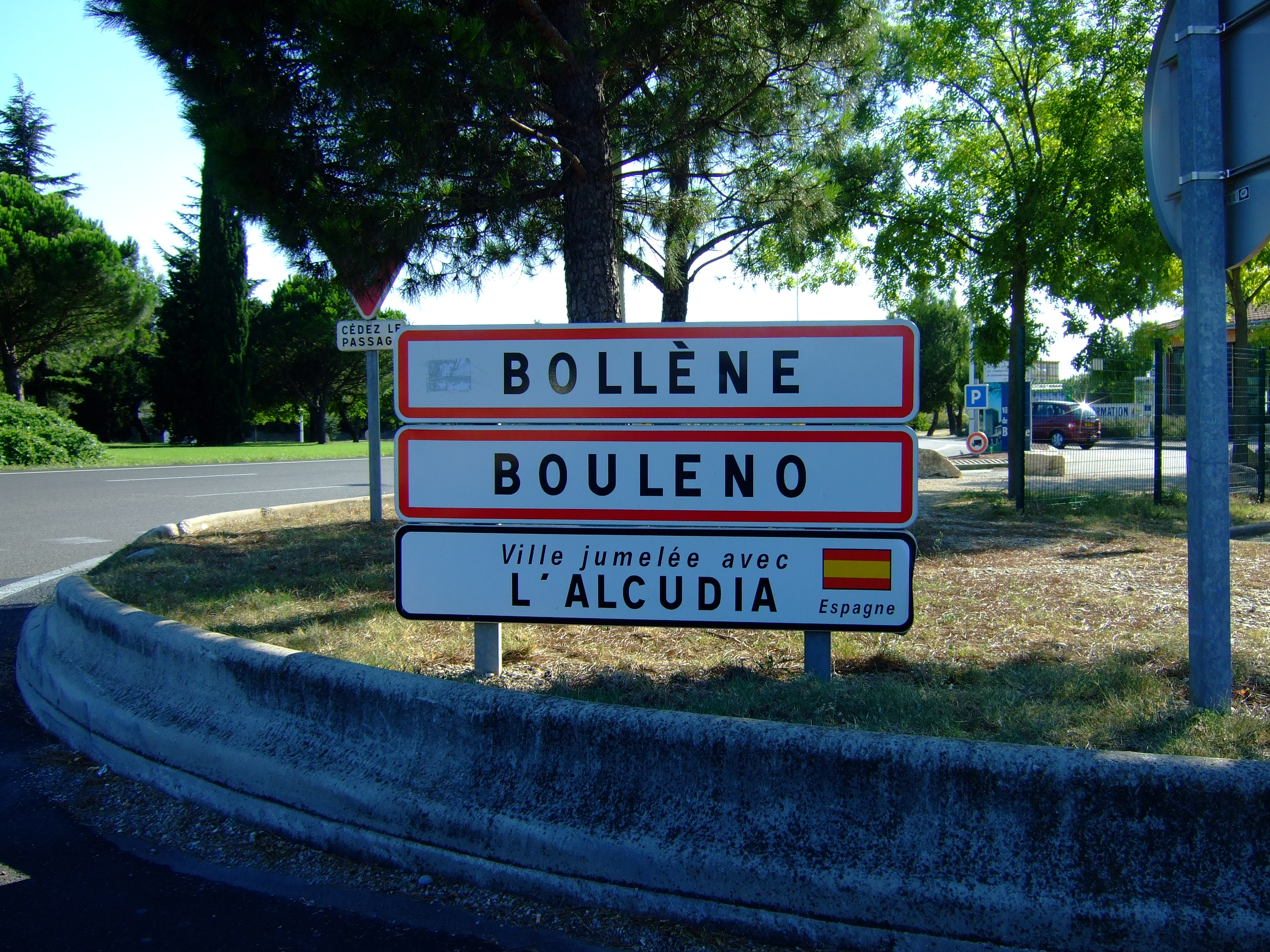
- Entrance of Bollène. The second sign shows the town name in Provençal. The third one its twin town.

- Coat of arms
- Location of Bollène
- Location within France Location within Provence-Alpes-Côte d'Azur
- Coordinates: 44°16′52″N 4°44′58″E
- Country: France
- Region: Provence-Alpes-Côte d'Azur
- Department: Vaucluse
- Arrondissement: Carpentras
- Canton: Bollène
- Intercommunality: Rhône-Lez-Provence

Government
  - Mayor (2020–2026): Anthony Zilio
- Area^{1}: 54.03 km^{2} (20.86 sq mi)
- Elevation: 55 m (180 ft)
- Highest elevation: 312 m (1,024 ft)
- Lowest elevation: 42 m (138 ft)
- Population (2023): 14,024
  - Density: 259.6/km^{2} (672.3/sq mi)
- Time zone: UTC+01:00 (CET)
  - Summer (DST): UTC+02:00 (CEST)
- INSEE/Postal code: 84019 /84500
- ^{1} French Land Register data, which excludes lakes, ponds, glaciers > 1 km^{2} (0.386 sq mi or 247 acres) and river estuaries.

Bollène (French pronunciation: [bɔlɛn]; Provençal: Bouleno [bu'lɛnə]) is a commune in the Vaucluse department in the Provence-Alpes-Côte d'Azur region in southeastern France.

== Geography ==
Bollène is a commune located in the north of the Vaucluse department next to the junction of Drôme, Ardèche and Gard departments. Located near major communication routes, the city (old town) occupies the northern end of a sandstone plateau where lie the communes of Mondragon, Mornas, Uchaux and Lagarde-Paréol. The rest of the town, including the lower town, stretches over a fertile plain which rests on a large layer of clay.

== Population ==
Historical population
Year	Pop.	±% p.a.
1968	11,555	—
1975	11,434	−0.15%
1982	12,679	+1.49%
1990	13,907	+1.16%
1999	14,130	+0.18%
2007	14,001	−0.11%
2012	14,131	+0.19%
2017	13,504	−0.90%
2023	14,024	+0.63%
Source: INSEE

== Twin towns ==
Bollène is twinned with L'Alcúdia, Spain, since 1994.

== See also ==
- Communes of the Vaucluse department
- Tricastin Nuclear Power Center
- Félix Charpentier. Sculptor of Bollène War Memorial
