= Uchaux Massif =

Massif in the French Prealps

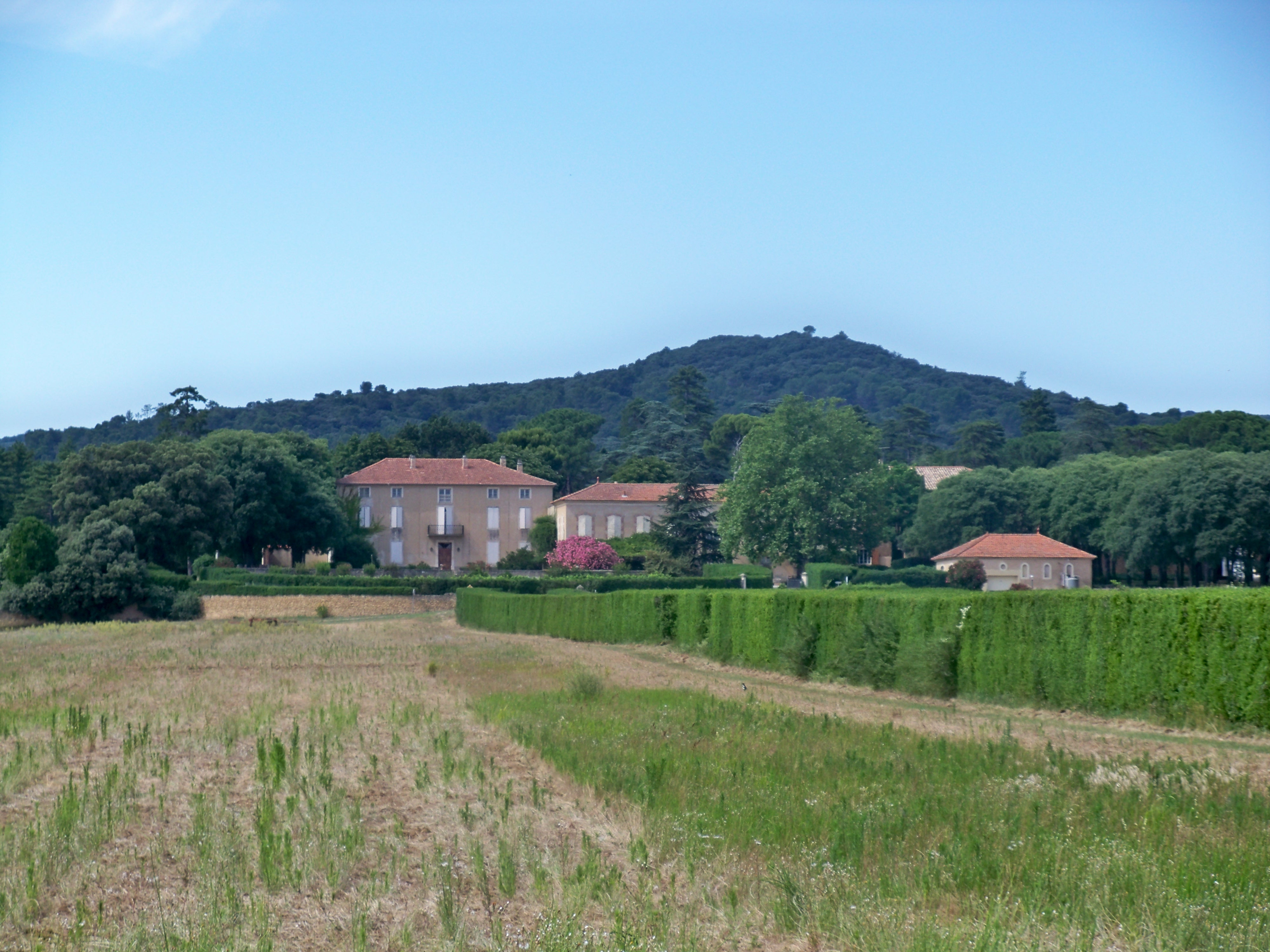
- View from Château Saint Estève d'Uchaux

Highest point
- Coordinates: 44°13′52″N 4°48′13″E

Naming
- Native name: Massif d'Uchaux (French)

Geography
- Location within France Location within Provence-Alpes-Côte d'Azur
- Country: France
- Region: Provence-Alpes-Côte d'Azur
- Departments: Vaucluse; Drôme

Geology
- Rock type: Sedimentary rock

The Uchaux Massif is a massif in the Baronnies, a part of the Provence Prealps. It is located in the departments of Vaucluse, in the communes of Lagarde-Paréol, Uchaux, Sérignan-du-Comtat, Piolenc and Mondragon, and in Drôme in the commune of Rochegude.

== Geography ==
This massif, covering several hundred hectares, is geologically diverse with its limestone and siliceous strata. On limestone terrains, one can find Kermes oak, white oak, evergreen oak, Aleppo pine, grey-leaved cistus, cade juniper, and common juniper. The siliceous flora includes heathers, strawberry trees, sage-leaved rock rose, and maritime pines.

== History ==
Human presence in the massif dates back to ancient times. In the commune of Sérignan-du-Comtat, scrapers, flints, and knives have been discovered, indicating prehistoric occupation, along with a polished neolithic axe found in the commune of Rochegude. Roman colonization left significant traces in the hamlet of Les Farjons, such as vases, pottery, and statuettes. During the Roman Empire, the massif was traversed by the Via Agrippa of the Rhône valley, although its exact route is still debated.
