= Blacasset =

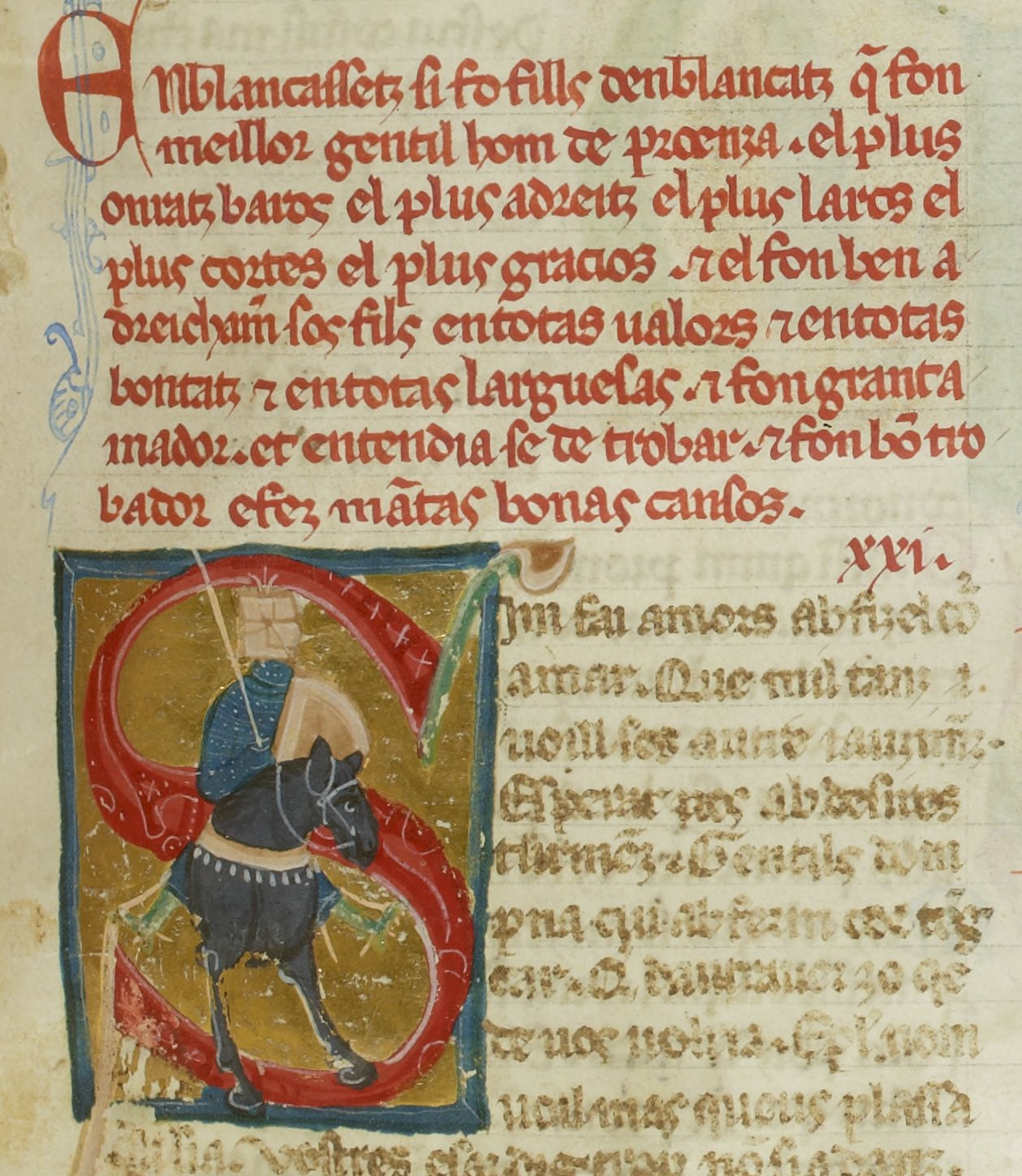
En blancassetz si fo fills denblancatz q' fon meillor gentil hom de proenza. . . Sir Blacasset was the son of Sir Blacatz, who was the greatest gentleman in Provence. . ."

Blacasset, Blacassetz, Blacssetz, or Blachessetz (fl. 1233–1242) was a Provençal troubadour of the noble family of the Blacas, lords of Aulps, in the Empire. He was probably a son of the troubadour Blacatz, as his vida alleges, though this has come into doubt. He was also distantly related to Charles I of Naples and Raymond Berengar IV of Provence. According to his vida, he was like his father in merit, good deeds, and munificence, and also reputed to be a good lover.

"Blacasset" is a diminutive of his father's name (Latin: Blacacius). A document of 1238 (two years after his father's death) mentions three sons of the elder Blacatz, two of which were named Blacacius. Blacasset was not a professional troubadour, but, like his father, an amateur. Eleven of his works survive, three sirventes, four cansos, and four coblas, including one single-stanza canso with a melody in F major, Ben volgra quem venques merces. This song was appended to a manuscript of the chansonnier du roi of Theobald I of Navarre in the early fourteenth-century. Among his other works are:

- A Lunel lutz una luna luzens, a tenso with Guilhem de Montanhagol in the trobar clus style about a lady, Guiza (Gauzeranda) de Lunel
- Lo bels douz temps mi platz, a sirventes he wrote for the conte de Proensa (count of Provence)
- De guerra fi desiros
- Mos voler es quez eu m' eslanz

== Sources ==
- Aubrey, Elizabeth. The Music of the Troubadours. Indiana University Press, 1996. ISBN 0-253-21389-4.
- Bertoni, G. "Il complemento del conzoniere provenzale di Bernart Amoros." Giornale storico della letteratura italiana, 34 (1899) pp. 118–140.
- Egan, Margarita, ed. and trans. The Vidas of the Troubadours. New York: Garland, 1984. ISBN 0-8240-9437-9.
