= Blacatz =

French troubadour (1165–1237)

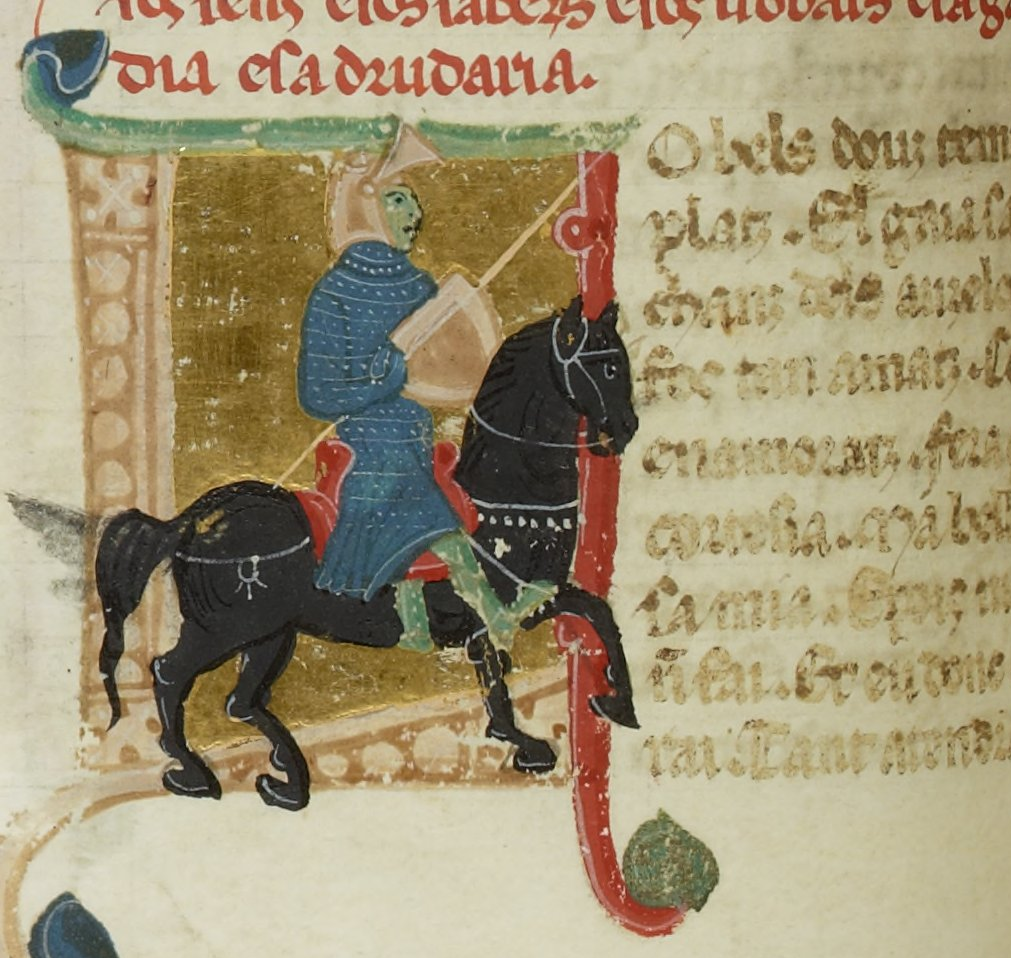
Blacatz as a knight in a 13th-century miniature

Blacatz, known in French genealogy as Blacas de Blacas III (1165–1237), was the feudal lord of Aups and a troubadour. Sordello composed a lament (planh) on his death, inviting the kings of his time to share and eat the heart of Blacatz and thus acquire a portion of his courage.

He was the father of the troubadour Blacasset.
