= Château de Carros =

Castle in Provence-Alpes-Côte d'Azur, France

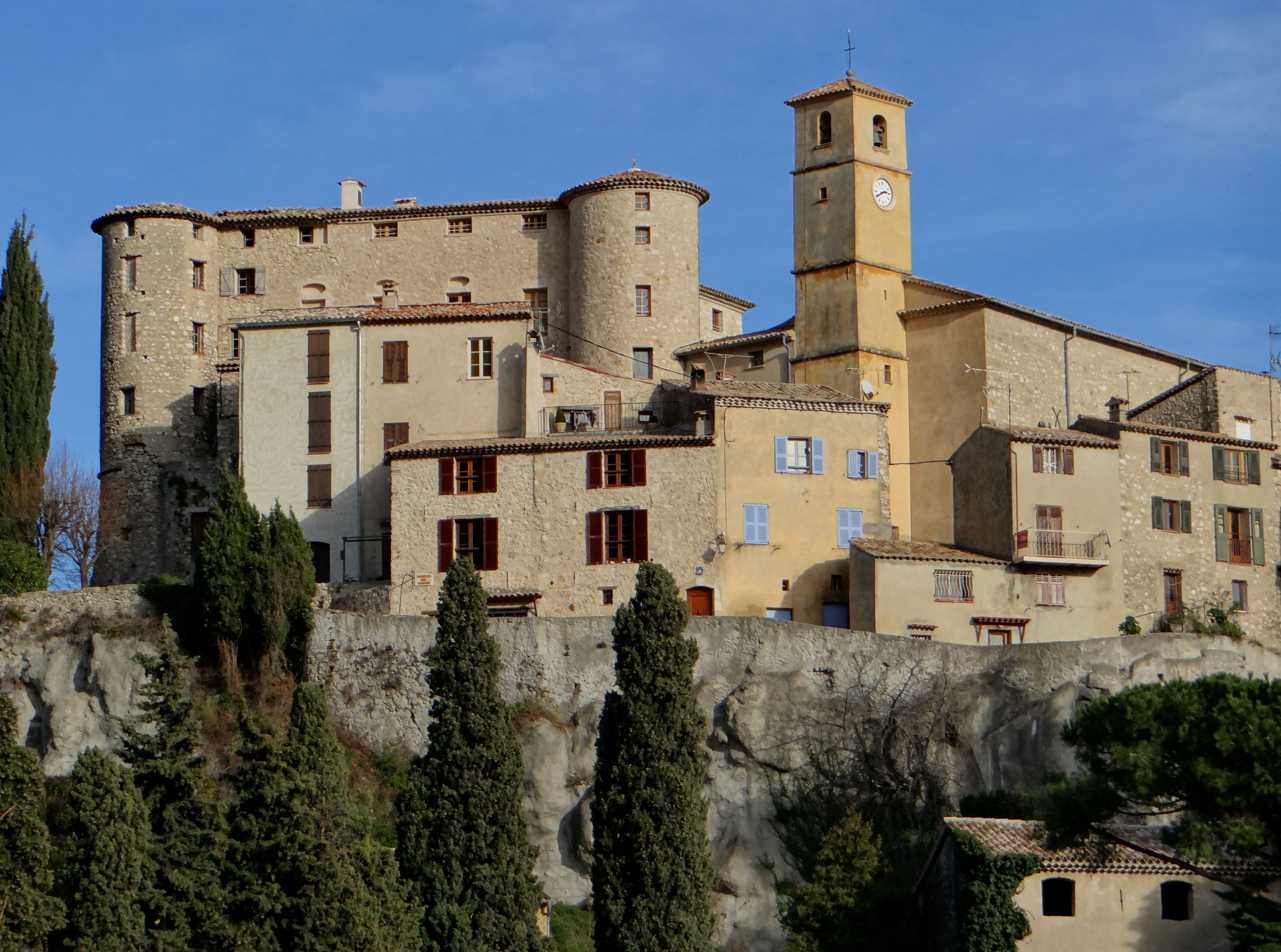
- View of the ancient village of Carros, with its church and the château
- 43.7925147°N 7.1869801°E
- Location: Carros, France
- Type: Modern art museum
- Opening date: 12th century

The château de Carros is located at the top of the ancient village of Carros, in the département of Alpes-Maritimes, région of Provence-Alpes-Côte d'Azur, France.

== History ==
The Chateau dates from the late 13th century, when it was in the possession of the House of Blacas.

== See also ==
- List of castles in France
