= Château Saint-Jeannet =

Coordinates: 43.7434°N 7.1681°E

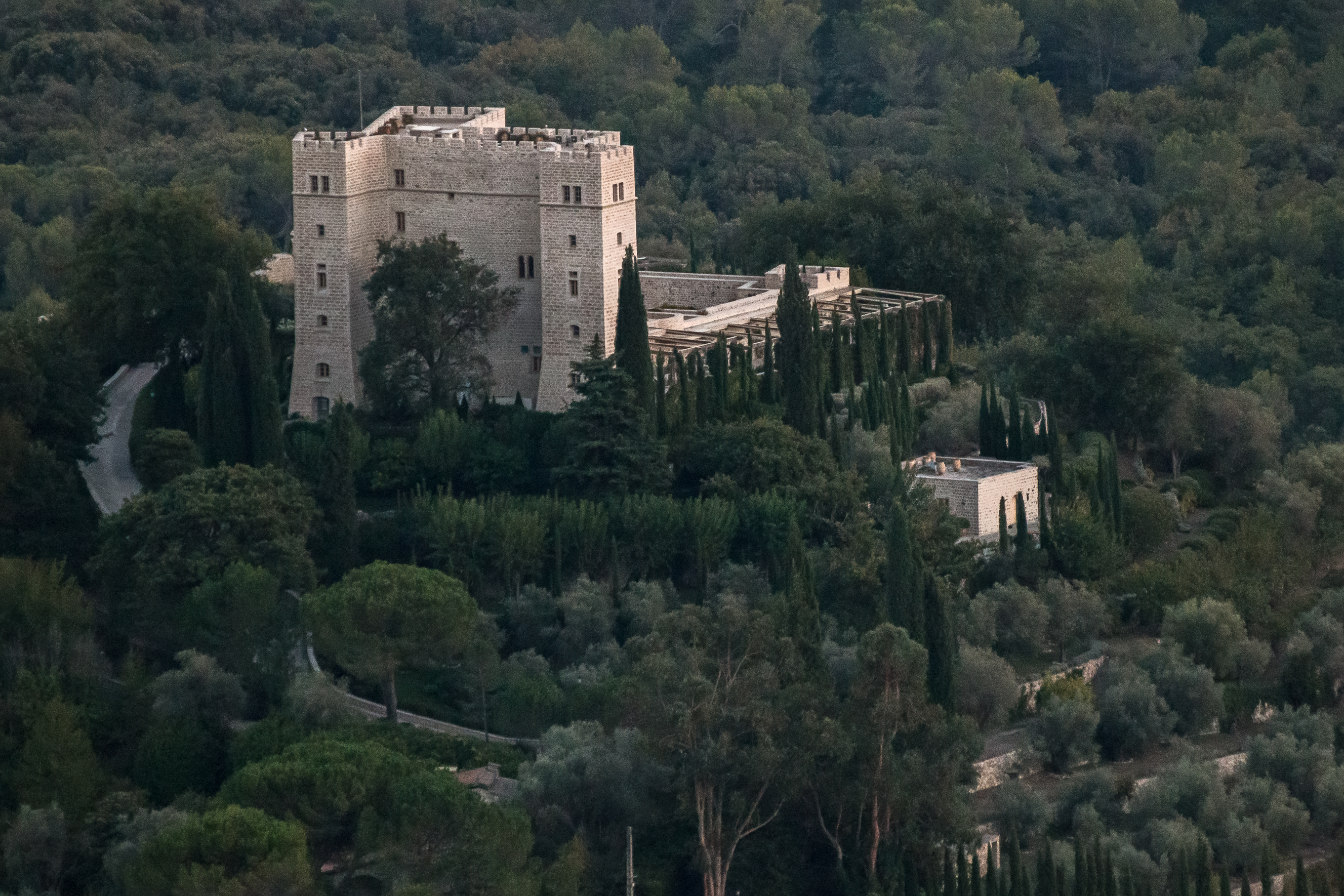
The château in 2016

The Château Saint-Jeannet is a notable French château located in the Côte d'Azur, about 10 km (6.2 mi) northwest of the city of Nice.

== Nomenclature ==
Prior to major renovations completed in 2009, it was known as the Château de la Gaude, because it is situated in the village of La Gaude, just south of Saint-Jeannet proper.

The name was changed in collaboration with the local mayoral authority. This was done in order to provide an association with the more well-known historical village of Saint-Jeannet, which overlooks it, as well as to disambiguate it from the Chateau de la Gaude located in Aix-en-Provence.

== History ==
Tradition holds that the site was used as a Templar fortress as early the 9th and 10th centuries. However, the earliest known construction on the château hill can only be dated to the 11th century. Written records of a château on the site date to the 13th century. Since that time, it has been effectively destroyed and rebuilt several times.

The most recent reconstruction, completed in 2009, recovered evidence of the design of that earliest fort, and has attempted to echo it in the placement of the road, outer walls, and observatory tower. It also made the building liveable and able to generate an income as a wedding and events venue. This income has permitted the site to be maintained into the present day, and broken the cycle of ruin and restoration.

A book has been printed on the subject of the château's extensive history which goes into much greater detail of its medieval significance as a defensive fortress against Italian incursion into the principality of Nice.
