= Canton of Bollène =

Coordinates: 44°15′10″N 4°45′26″E

Bollène
- Canton
- Country: France
- Region: Provence-Alpes-Côte d'Azur
- Department: Vaucluse
- No. of communes: {{{nbcomm}}}
- Area: 217.52 km^{2} (83.98 sq mi)
- Population (2023): 32,295
  - Density: 148.47/km^{2} (384.53/sq mi)
- INSEE code: 84 05

The canton of Bollène is a French administrative division located in the department of Vaucluse and region Provence-Alpes-Côte d'Azur region.

== Composition ==
At the French canton reorganisation which came into effect in March 2015, the canton was expanded from 7 to 9 communes:

- Bollène
- Lagarde-Paréol
- Lamotte-du-Rhône
- Lapalud
- Mondragon
- Mornas
- Sainte-Cécile-les-Vignes
- Sérignan-du-Comtat
- Uchaux
