= Château de la Gaude =

Coordinates: 43.5689°N 5.4785°E

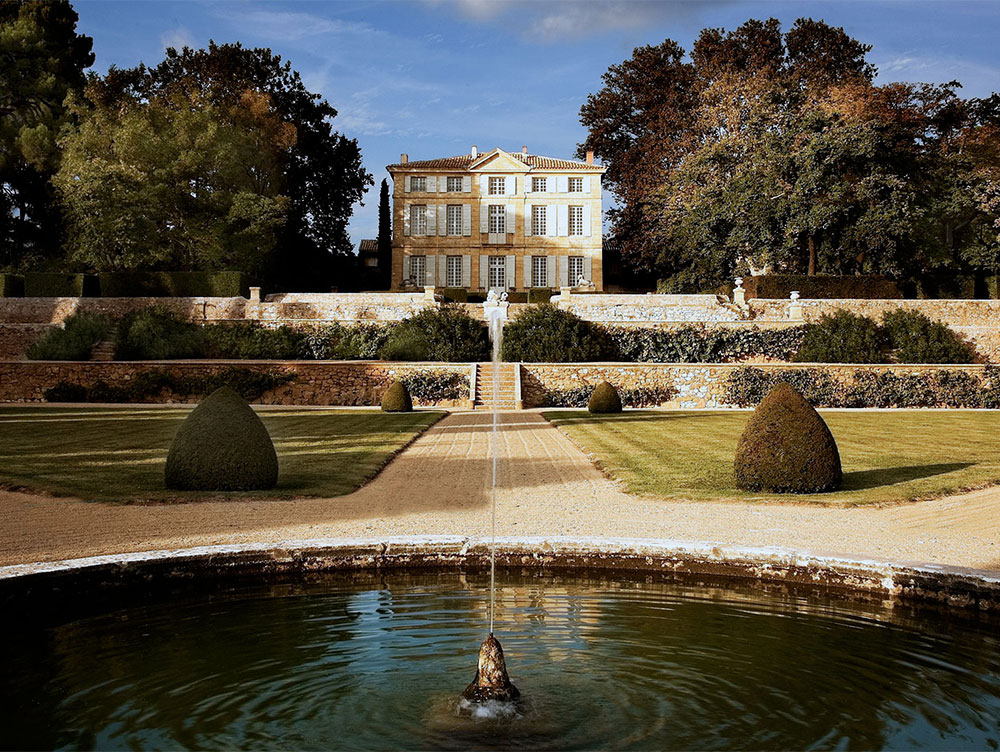
- Interactive map of the Château de la Gaude area

General information
- Type: Château
- Location: Route des Pinchinats, Aix-en-Provence, France
- Owner: Didier Blaise

Website
- https://chateaudelagaude.com

The Château de la Gaude: Hotel, gourmet restaurant and shop in Aix-en-Provence.

== Location ==
It is located on the Route des Pinchinats in Aix-en-Provence. It is on the same road as the Château de la Mignarde, another listed chateau, though further north.

== History ==
It was built in the eighteenth century. It spans seventeen hectares. The driveway to the three-story bastide is bordered by chestnut trees on each side. The garden has ponds, fountains, a French formal garden with a yew maze, several terraces, and even an alleyway for butterfly-hunting. Additionally, there is a chapel. The estate is also home to a vineyard, and sells wine.

It is owned by Didier Blaise.

== Heritage significance ==
It has been listed as a monument historique since 1963.
