= Blacas =

Coat of arms of Blacas d'Aulps family

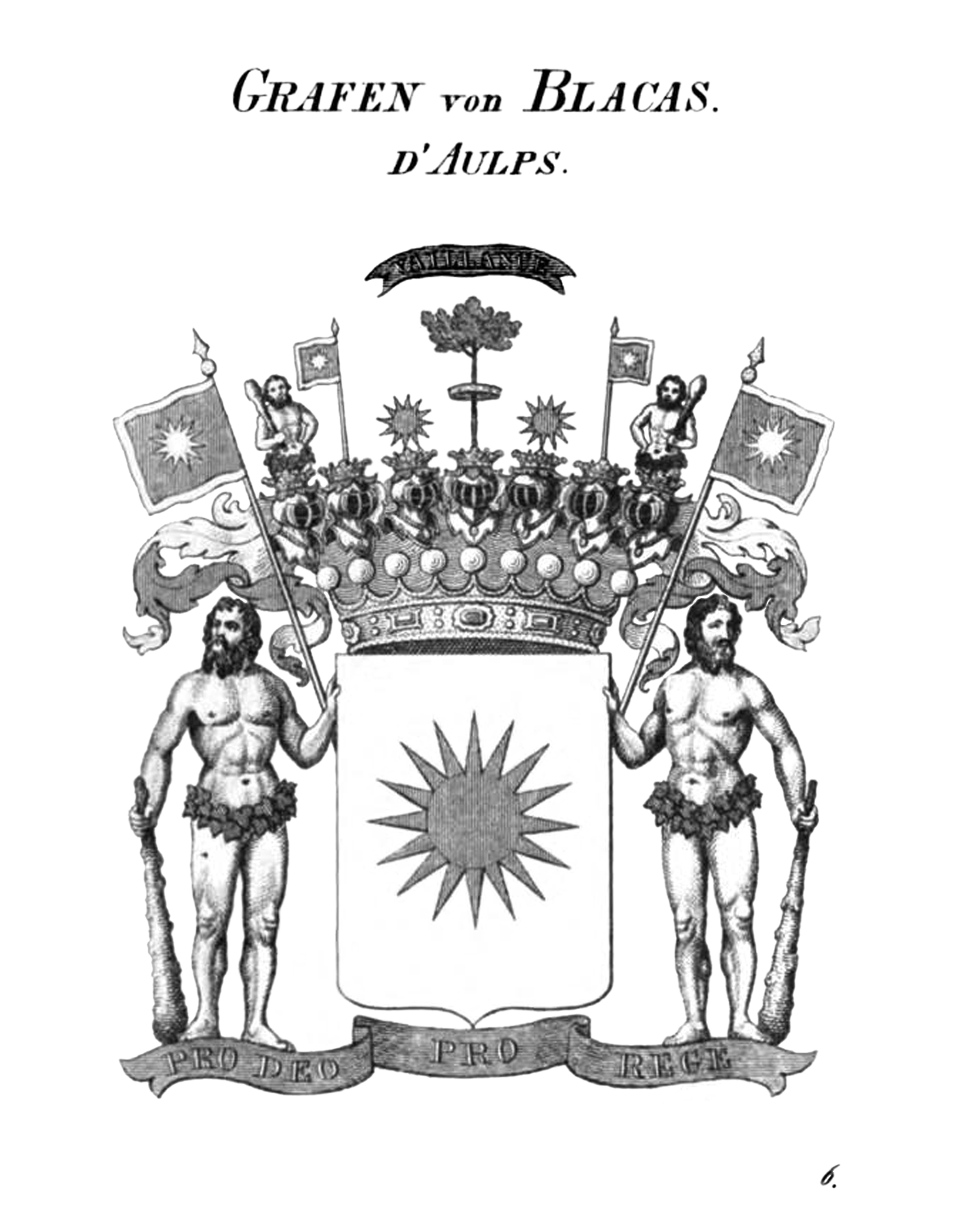
Coat of arms of Counts Blacas d'Aulps

The House of Blacas is the name of two ancient French noble houses which successively owned the Lordship of Aups with its castle in Provence (whose name is still spelled in the ancient form Aulps in their surname).

== Blacas d'Aulps family ==
The first Blacas, Pierre d'Aulps, is said to have participated in the First Crusade and to have stemmed from the House of Baux, whose arms are similar to those of Blacas, but with the tinctures reversed (this claimed filiation is still expressed by the two banners with the Baux arms in the coat of arms of the Dukes of Blacas). As early as the 12th century his grandson Blacacius de Blacas (died 1236), called "the great warrior," distinguished himself among the most valiant knights of the court of Ramon Berenguer IV, Count of Provence. He married Laure of Castellane, and excelled as both a soldier and a troubadour. He left three sons, two named after him and one named Boniface. Blacasset succeeded his father as a troubadour while Boniface succeeded in Aulps and married Ayceline of Moustiers. From this union was born another Blacasset, who accompanied Charles I to Naples. His name was immortalized by Frédéric Mistral who attributed him the positioning of the chain that links up the two boulders at Moustiers-Sainte-Marie. Captured by infidels, Blacasset is supposed to have vowed that, if freed, he would stretch this chain between the boulders and from it suspend a sixteen-branched star, emblem of his family.

The first house of Blacas became extinct at the end of the 14th century, but its heiress, Philippa de Blacas, married around 1380 Rostang de Soleilhas (perhaps a relative in the male line) who then assumed the name and arms of Blacas. The present house of Blacas descends from them.

Lords of the town of Aups, the family fought with the town from 1346 to 1712. Aups won the contest in the end, becoming a direct legal dependent of the French king. The Blacas d'Aulps family possessed the castles of Vérignon and of Aups as well as many other domains in the current district around Aups. The most famous member of the family was Pierre-Louis de Blacas d'Aulps, Count and later 1st Duke of Blacas, Peer of France, a renowned antiquarian and minister to King Louis XVIII during the Bourbon Restoration and a fervent legitimist after 1830.

The present Head of the House and arms is Casimir Marie Bertrand Michel de Blacas d'Aulps, 7th Duke of Blacas, 7th Fürst von Aulps (b. 1943). He is married to Caroline Marie-Hélène de Forton (b. 1948) and has a son and two daughters.

== Duke of Blacas (1821) ==
Duke of Blacas is a title in the Peerage of France. It was created by ordinance dated 30 April 1821 and Letters patent dated 11 September 1824 for Pierre-Louis de Blacas d'Aulps, only surviving son of Alexandre-Pierre de Blacas, Lord of Aulps, Vérignon, Fabrègues, etc., Knight of Saint-Louis (known as le marquis de Blacas). He was a member of the Government of the first Bourbon restoration from 13 May 1814 to 19 March 1815. The 1st Duke had been previously made an hereditary Peer (without specific rank) as early as 17 August 1815, and had been created Count of Blacas in the French Peerage by ordinance dated 31 August 1817, but having not been regulated by Letters patent, this previous comital title did not become hereditary. In 1830, he refused to recognize Louis-Philippe as King of the French and so lost his seat in the House of Peers. Later, he also received, by diploma dated 23 June 1838, the Austrian title of prince (Fürst von Blacas d'Aulps), hereditary in the male line reserved only for the Head of the family (with the title of Count for cadet sons).

- Pierre-Louis de Blacas d'Aulps, Count and then 1st Duke of Blacas, 1st Prince of Blacas (1771-1839)
- Louis de Blacas d'Aulps, 2nd Duke of Blacas, 2nd Prince of Blacas (1815–1866), son of the 1st Duke
- Casimir de Blacas d'Aulps, 3rd Duke of Blacas, 3rd Prince of Blacas (1847-1866), son of the 2d Duke
- Pierre de Blacas d'Aulps, 4th Duke of Blacas, 4th Prince of Blacas (1853-1937), brother of the 3rd Duke
- Stanislas de Blacas d'Aulps, 5th Duke of Blacas, 5th Prince of Blacas (1885-1941), son of the 4th Duke
- Pierre de Blacas d'Aulps de La Baume-Pluvinel, 6th Duke of Blacas, 6th Prince of Blacas (1913-1997), son of the 5th Duke
- Casimir de Blacas d'Aulps, 7th Duke of Blacas, 7th Prince of Blacas (1943-), son of the 6th Duke

The Heir Apparent is the present holder's only son Marquis Louis-Stanislas de Blacas d'Aulps (b.1982).

The family seat is now the Château d'Ussé (Indre-et-Loire), inherited in 1883.

== Arms ==
Argent, a star of sixteen points gules. Two banners gules, a star of sixteen points argent, crossed in saltier behind the shield surmounted by a coronet of prince and supported by two wild men proper, under the mantel and ducal coronet of a Peer of France (the mantle azure lined with ermine and fringed with gold). Motto: PRO DEO, PRO REGE. Crest: An oak sinople issuant from a French Baron's coronet proper. War-cry: VAILLANCE.

According to Frédéric Mistral, the family crest is canting because blacas also means "white oak" in Provençal
