= Pontevès =

- Commune
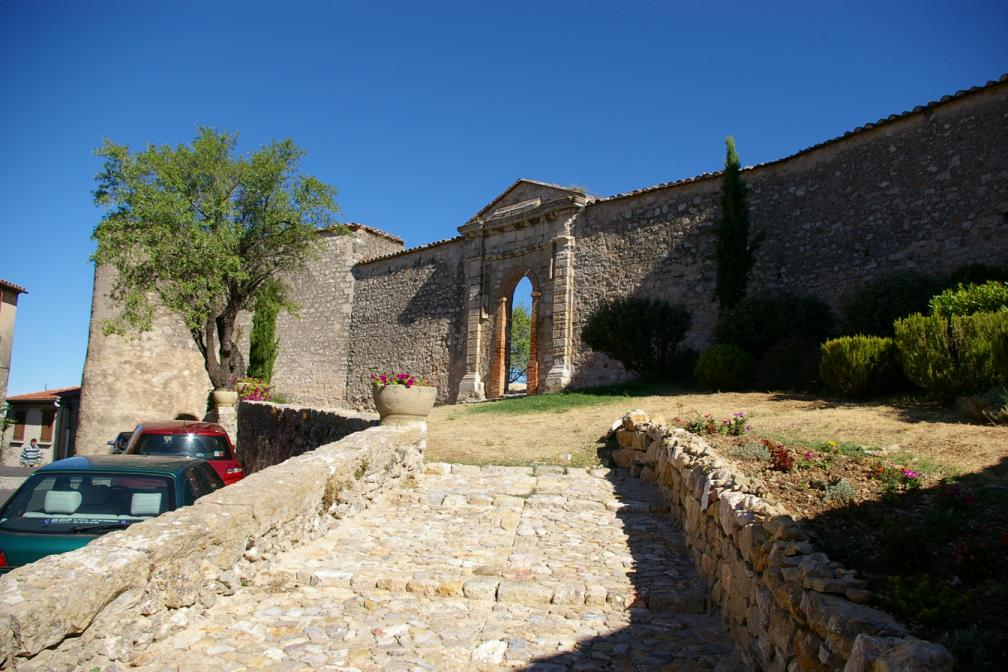
- The Château of Pontevès

- Coat of arms
- Location of Pontevès
- Location within France Location within Provence-Alpes-Côte d'Azur
- Coordinates: 43°33′16″N 6°01′48″E
- Country: France
- Region: Provence-Alpes-Côte d'Azur
- Department: Var
- Arrondissement: Brignoles
- Canton: Saint-Maximin-la-Sainte-Baume
- Intercommunality: Provence Verdon

Government
  - Mayor (2020–2026): Frank Panizzi
- Area^{1}: 41.07 km^{2} (15.86 sq mi)
- Elevation: 400 m (1,300 ft)
- Highest elevation: 813 m (2,667 ft)
- Lowest elevation: 240 m (790 ft)
- Population (2023): 784
  - Density: 19.1/km^{2} (49.4/sq mi)
- Demonym: Pontevèsois
- Time zone: UTC+01:00 (CET)
  - Summer (DST): UTC+02:00 (CEST)
- INSEE/Postal code: 83095 /83670
- ^{1} French Land Register data, which excludes lakes, ponds, glaciers > 1 km^{2} (0.386 sq mi or 247 acres) and river estuaries.

Pontevès (French pronunciation: [pɔ̃tvɛs]) is a commune in the Var department in the Provence-Alpes-Côte d'Azur region in southeastern France.

== See also ==
- Château de Pontevès
- Communes of the Var department
