= Lagarde-Paréol =

- Commune
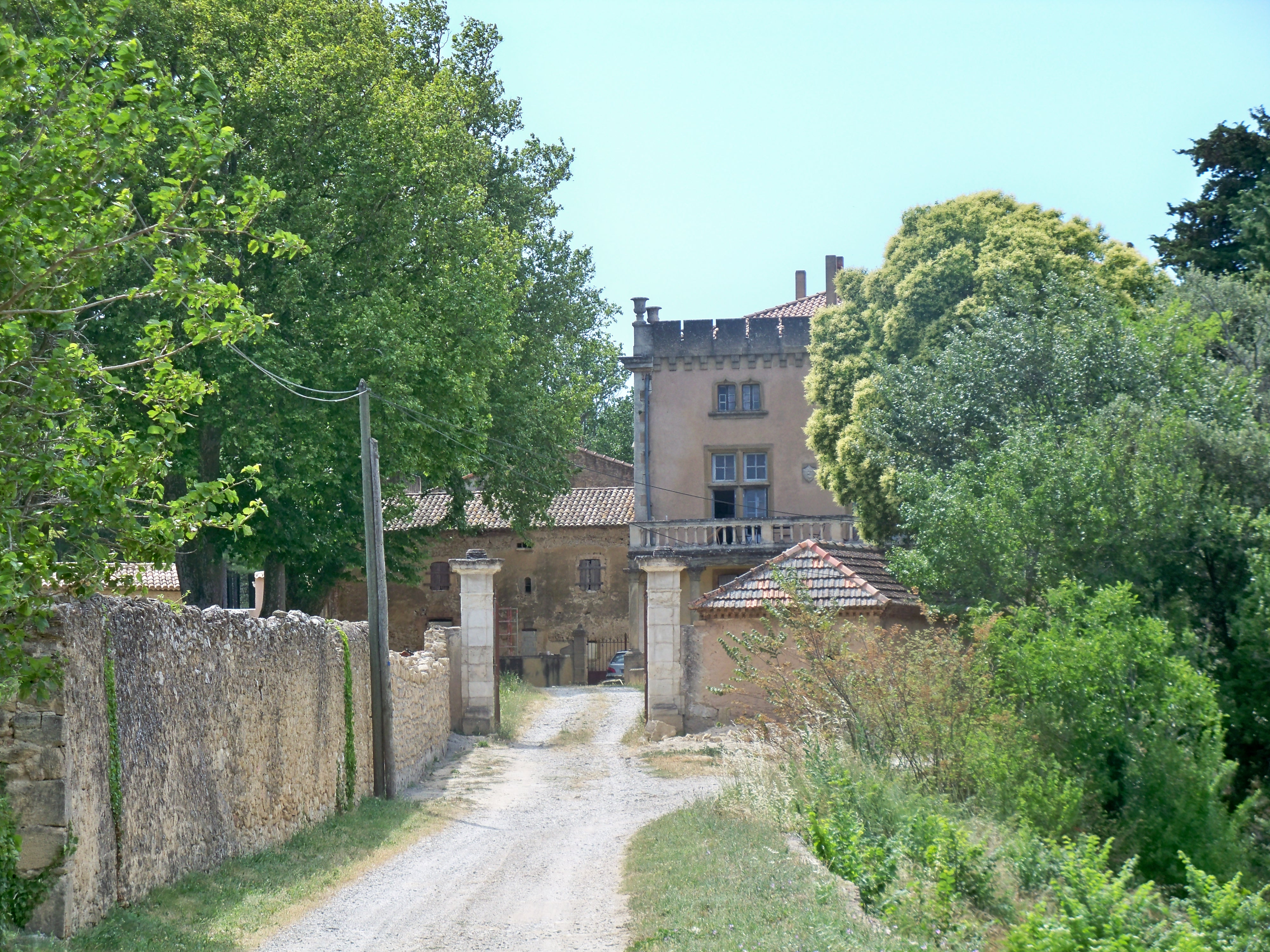
- The Château Fonsalette, and one of the most prestigious areas in Côtes du Rhône

- Coat of arms
- Location of Lagarde-Paréol
- Location within France Location within Provence-Alpes-Côte d'Azur
- Coordinates: 44°13′44″N 4°51′06″E
- Country: France
- Region: Provence-Alpes-Côte d'Azur
- Department: Vaucluse
- Arrondissement: Carpentras
- Canton: Bollène

Government
  - Mayor (2020–2026): Fabrice Leaune
- Area^{1}: 9.29 km^{2} (3.59 sq mi)
- Elevation: 125 m (410 ft)
- Highest elevation: 253 m (830 ft)
- Lowest elevation: 84 m (276 ft)
- Population (2023): 319
  - Density: 34.3/km^{2} (88.9/sq mi)
- Time zone: UTC+01:00 (CET)
  - Summer (DST): UTC+02:00 (CEST)
- INSEE/Postal code: 84061 /84290
- ^{1} French Land Register data, which excludes lakes, ponds, glaciers > 1 km^{2} (0.386 sq mi or 247 acres) and river estuaries.

Lagarde-Paréol (French pronunciation: [laɡaʁd paʁeɔl]; Occitan: La Gàrda Pariòu) is a commune in the Vaucluse department in the Provence-Alpes-Côte d'Azur region in southeastern France.

== Name ==
The settlement is attested as seignoriu de la Garda Pariol ca. 1180.

== See also ==
- Communes of the Vaucluse department
