= Uchaux =

Uchaux Uchau (Occitan)
- Commune
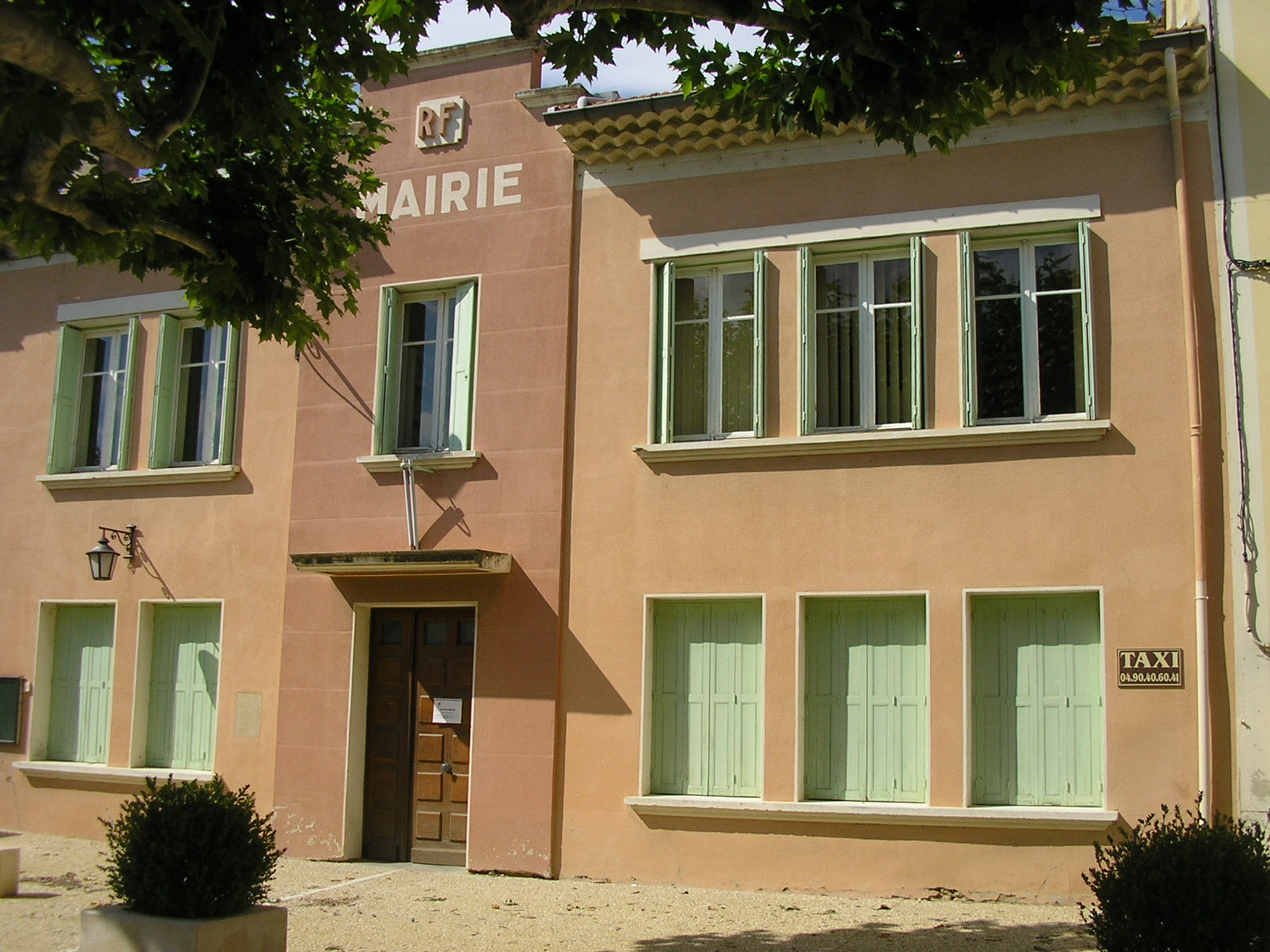
- Uchaux Town Hall

- Coat of arms
- Location of Uchaux
- Location within France Location within Provence-Alpes-Côte d'Azur
- Coordinates: 44°12′38″N 4°48′06″E
- Country: France
- Region: Provence-Alpes-Côte d'Azur
- Department: Vaucluse
- Arrondissement: Carpentras
- Canton: Bollène
- Intercommunality: CC Aygues Ouvèze en Provence

Government
  - Mayor (2020–2026): Christine Lanthelme
- Area^{1}: 18.48 km^{2} (7.14 sq mi)
- Elevation: 100 m (330 ft)
- Highest elevation: 285 m (935 ft)
- Lowest elevation: 46 m (151 ft)
- Population (2023): 1,699
  - Density: 91.94/km^{2} (238.1/sq mi)
- Demonym: Uchaliens
- Time zone: UTC+01:00 (CET)
  - Summer (DST): UTC+02:00 (CEST)
- INSEE/Postal code: 84135 /84100
- Website: www.uchaux.fr
- ^{1} French Land Register data, which excludes lakes, ponds, glaciers > 1 km^{2} (0.386 sq mi or 247 acres) and river estuaries.

Uchaux (French pronunciation: [yʃo]; Occitan: Uchau) is a commune in the Vaucluse department in the Provence-Alpes-Côte d'Azur region in Southeastern France. It is located on the departmental border with Drôme, bordering Rochegude.

Local landscapes include Provençal vineyards and forests.

== Geography ==
Uchaux is 9 km (5.5 mi) southeast of the town of Bollène, seat of the larger canton of Bollène. It is 8 km (4.9 mi) north of the city of Orange.

On 1 January 2017, together with a number of neighbouring communes, it was transferred from the arrondissement of Avignon to the arrondissement of Carpentras.

== Demographics ==
Historical population
Year	Pop.	±% p.a.
1968	382	—
1975	460	+2.69%
1982	630	+4.60%
1990	1,322	+9.71%
1999	1,465	+1.15%
2007	1,360	−0.93%
2012	1,429	+0.99%
2017	1,649	+2.91%
2023	1,699	+0.50%
Source: INSEE

== Sights ==
Uchaux is home to the historical 16th-century Château de Massillan, built by Henry II of France for Diane de Poitiers, which was re-opened as a private hotel in 2000. To the southwest, the 13th-century hilltop Château du Castellas ruins have been a monument historique since 1994.

== See also ==
- Communes of the Vaucluse department
