= Mornas =

- Commune
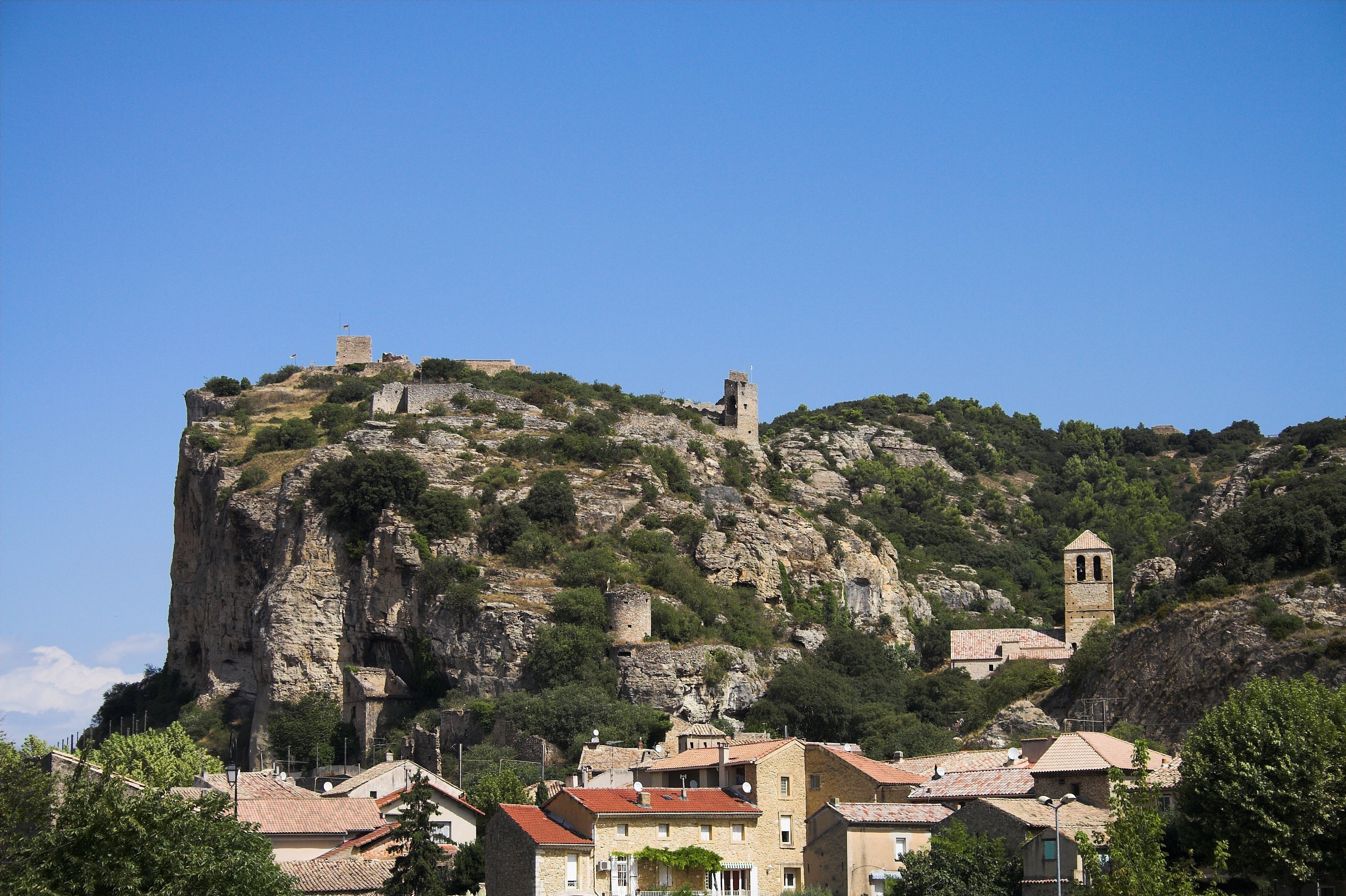
- Mornas and its fort

- Coat of arms
- Location of Mornas
- Location within France Location within Provence-Alpes-Côte d'Azur
- Coordinates: 44°12′34″N 4°43′37″E
- Country: France
- Region: Provence-Alpes-Côte d'Azur
- Department: Vaucluse
- Arrondissement: Carpentras
- Canton: Bollène
- Intercommunality: Rhône-Lez-Provence

Government
  - Mayor (2020–2026): Katy Ricard
- Area^{1}: 26.09 km^{2} (10.07 sq mi)
- Elevation: 38 m (125 ft)
- Highest elevation: 234 m (768 ft)
- Lowest elevation: 31 m (102 ft)
- Population (2023): 2,569
  - Density: 98.47/km^{2} (255.0/sq mi)
- Time zone: UTC+01:00 (CET)
  - Summer (DST): UTC+02:00 (CEST)
- INSEE/Postal code: 84083 /84550
- ^{1} French Land Register data, which excludes lakes, ponds, glaciers > 1 km^{2} (0.386 sq mi or 247 acres) and river estuaries.

Mornas (French pronunciation: [mɔʁnas]; Occitan: Mornats) is a commune in the Vaucluse department in the Provence-Alpes-Côte d'Azur region in southeastern France.

== Name ==
The settlement is attested as Morenatus in 822, Murenatis in 837 and Mornatz ca. 1178.

== History ==
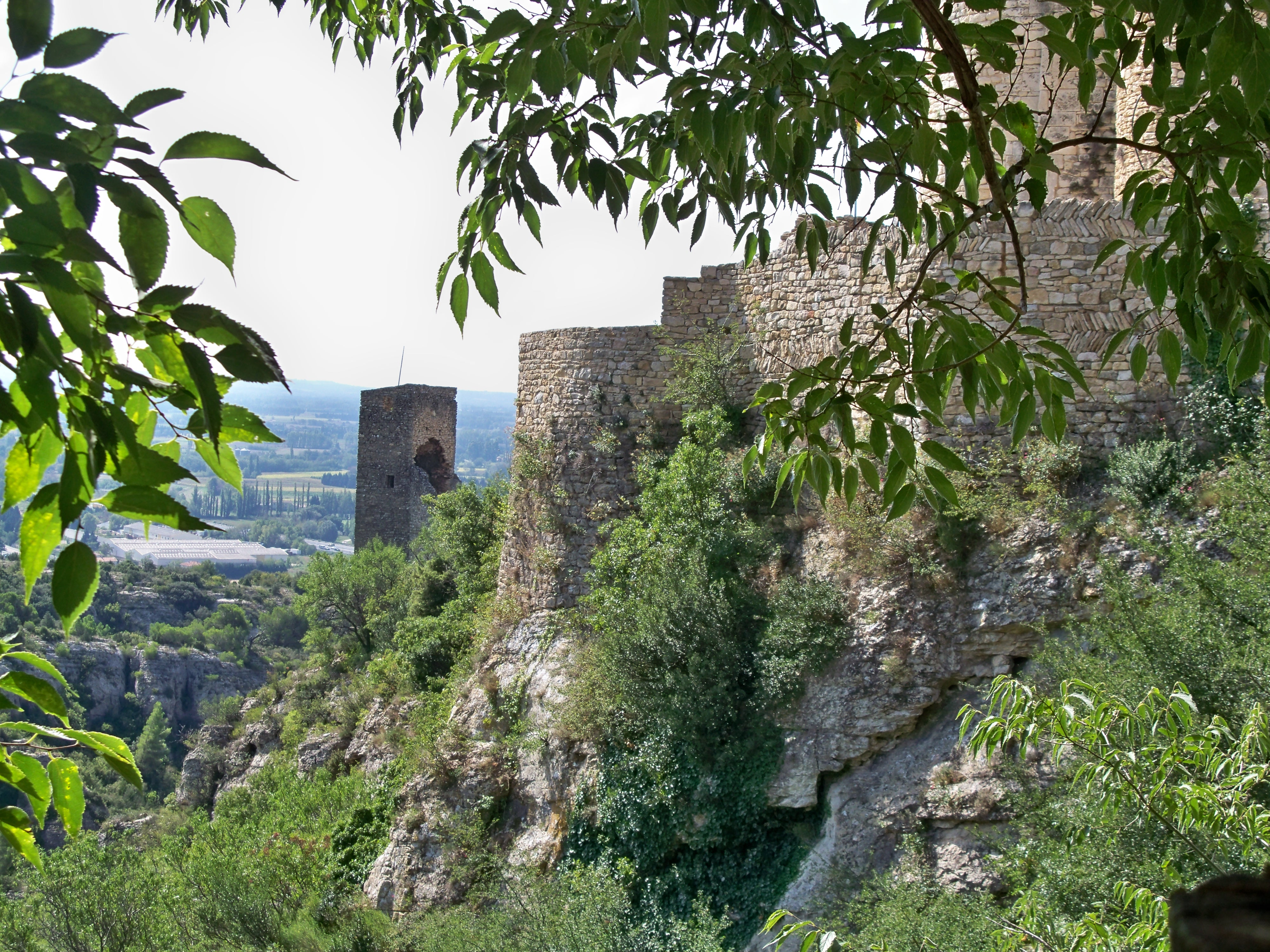
Remains of the fortress of Mornas, high above the village, in 2021

In the 12th century, the Counts of Toulouse, then in possession of the fortress, rebuilt and strengthened it. In 1229, with the Treaty of Paris, Raymond VII, Count of Toulouse, handed over the Comtat Venaissin to the Holy See. Mornas was thus a lordship of the archbishops of Arles until 1274, and then of the Holy See, which enfeoffed the lands to various lords. In 1430, Pellegrin Brunelli, a gentleman of the household of Pope Martin V, had to surrender the castle to the army of Cardinal de Foix.

The French Wars of Religion brought severe troubles to Mornas, notably in the form of two "sauteries", or "pertuisanades". In 1562, the Calvinists led by the seigneur de Montbrun seized the castle, massacred women and children, and threw the garrison from the top of the ramparts onto halberds below; there was only one survivor. In 1568, after Mornas had been taken by the count of Suze, the Protestant garrison suffered the same fate.

From the 17th century, Mornas was a centre for growing tobacco.

Before the French Revolution, the king of France allowed the seigneur of Mornas to lease the woodland to a farmer, who cleared it, thus depriving the village of its supply of firewood.

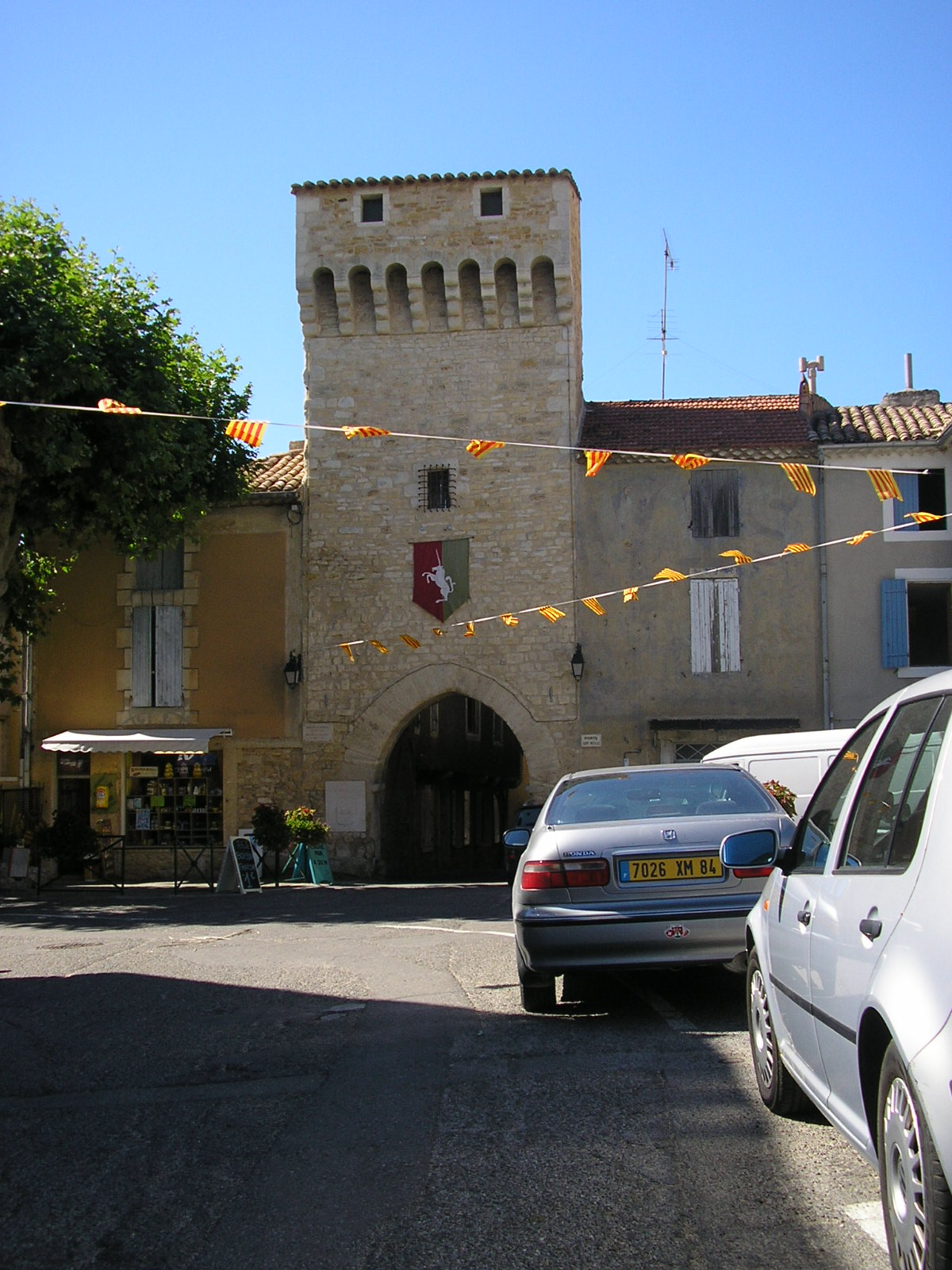
The Gate of Saint Nicholas in the Old Village

== Population ==
Historical population
Year	Pop.	±% p.a.
1968	1,103	—
1975	1,189	+1.08%
1982	1,737	+5.56%
1990	2,087	+2.32%
1999	2,209	+0.63%
2007	2,248	+0.22%
2012	2,334	+0.75%
2017	2,407	+0.62%
2023	2,569	+1.09%
Source: INSEE

== See also ==
- Communes of the Vaucluse department
