= Mondragon, Vaucluse =

Municipality in Provence-Alpes-Côte d'Azur, France

Mondragon
- Commune
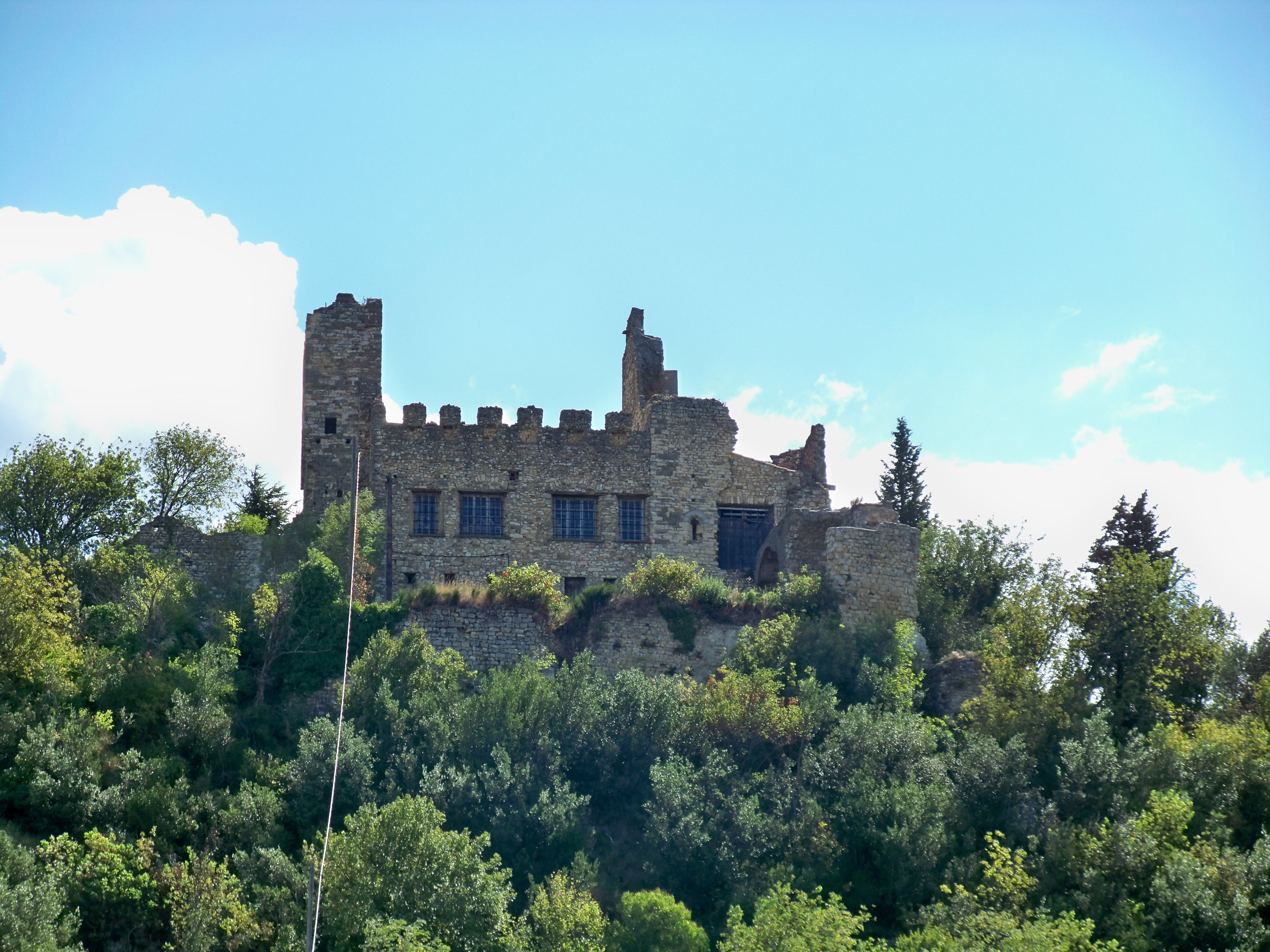
- Castle of Mondragon

- Coat of arms
- Location of Mondragon
- Location within France Location within Provence-Alpes-Côte d'Azur
- Coordinates: 44°14′21″N 4°42′49″E
- Country: France
- Region: Provence-Alpes-Côte d'Azur
- Department: Vaucluse
- Arrondissement: Carpentras
- Canton: Bollène

Government
  - Mayor (2020–2026): Christian Peyron
- Area^{1}: 40.65 km^{2} (15.70 sq mi)
- Elevation: 23 m (75 ft)
- Highest elevation: 217 m (712 ft)
- Lowest elevation: 34 m (112 ft)
- Population (2023): 3,833
  - Density: 94.29/km^{2} (244.2/sq mi)
- Time zone: UTC+01:00 (CET)
  - Summer (DST): UTC+02:00 (CEST)
- INSEE/Postal code: 84078 /84430
- ^{1} French Land Register data, which excludes lakes, ponds, glaciers > 1 km^{2} (0.386 sq mi or 247 acres) and river estuaries.

Mondragon (French pronunciation: [mɔ̃dʁaɡɔ̃]; Occitan: Montdragon) is a commune in the Vaucluse department in the Provence-Alpes-Côte d'Azur region in southeastern France.

It is known primarily for the large Donzère-Mondragon Dam across the river Rhône named for it and the town of Donzère.

It was once part of a Principality, connected to the Sovereign Principality of Orange, and to the Comtat Venaissin, an exclave of the Papal States. The coat of arms depicts a globus cruciger.

== History ==
In 1144, Emperor Conrad III granted Mondragon, with rights of high and low justice, to the Archbishop of Arles and granted him the title of Prince of the Holy Roman Empire. A lordly family already existed, the Dragonets of Mondragon. In 1143, William of Mondragon, son of Dragonet, paid homage to the archbishop.

But a charter from the early 12th century indicated that this fief was under the suzerainty of Raymond of Toulouse, Marquis of Provence. The Toulouse family only accepted the Dragonets as vassals, who had given their name to the hill on which their castrum had been built, the Mons Dragonis, and the enclave of Derboux was recognized as a barony of the Principality of Orange.

A charter of the Principality of Orange, dated 1128, confirmed that the feudatories of the Derboux enclave paid homage to the Prince of Orange. The struggle for influence between the Count of Provence and the Archbishop of Arles continued for centuries. In 1178, to counter the archbishop's grip, the Count of Toulouse granted Mondragon in paréage to several co-lords. In the 14th century, there were four: the Mondragons, the Cabris, the Montaigus, and the Cavaillons.

In 1224, Dragonet of Mondragon became the podestà of the city of Arles for a term of three years. The papal presence in Avignon lessened the conflict between the First Capetian House of Anjou, which had inherited the County of Provence, and the archbishops. To calm tensions, the Chalons, who succeeded the House of Baux as Princes of Orange, appointed co-lords of Mondragon as barons of Derboux. This was the case of Bertrand de Cabris who paid homage for it in.

This policy of pacification continued in the following century, since in 1510 Derboux was granted as a fief to Almaric and Dragonnet de Mondragon, who paid homage for it to the Prince of Orange.

In 1536, when Emperor Charles V invaded Provence, the parliamentarians of Aix took refuge in Mondragon. The same year, Francis I annexed the principality of Mondragon to the Kingdom of France. Francis II reversed this decision in 1560, and the co-lords continued to hold the title of "Prince of Mondragon" until the French Revolution.

During the 17th century, the lords of Suze and Rochegude were added to the list of fief-holders in Mondragon. Derboux was granted as a fief to Paul II de Mistral, co-lord of Mondragon, who paid homage for it in 1619.

== Population ==
Historical population
Year	Pop.	±% p.a.
1968	2,592	—
1975	2,399	−1.10%
1982	2,913	+2.81%
1990	3,118	+0.85%
1999	3,363	+0.84%
2007	3,548	+0.67%
2012	3,727	+0.99%
2017	3,792	+0.35%
2023	3,833	+0.18%
Source: INSEE

== See also ==
- Communes of the Vaucluse department
