= Aups =

- Commune
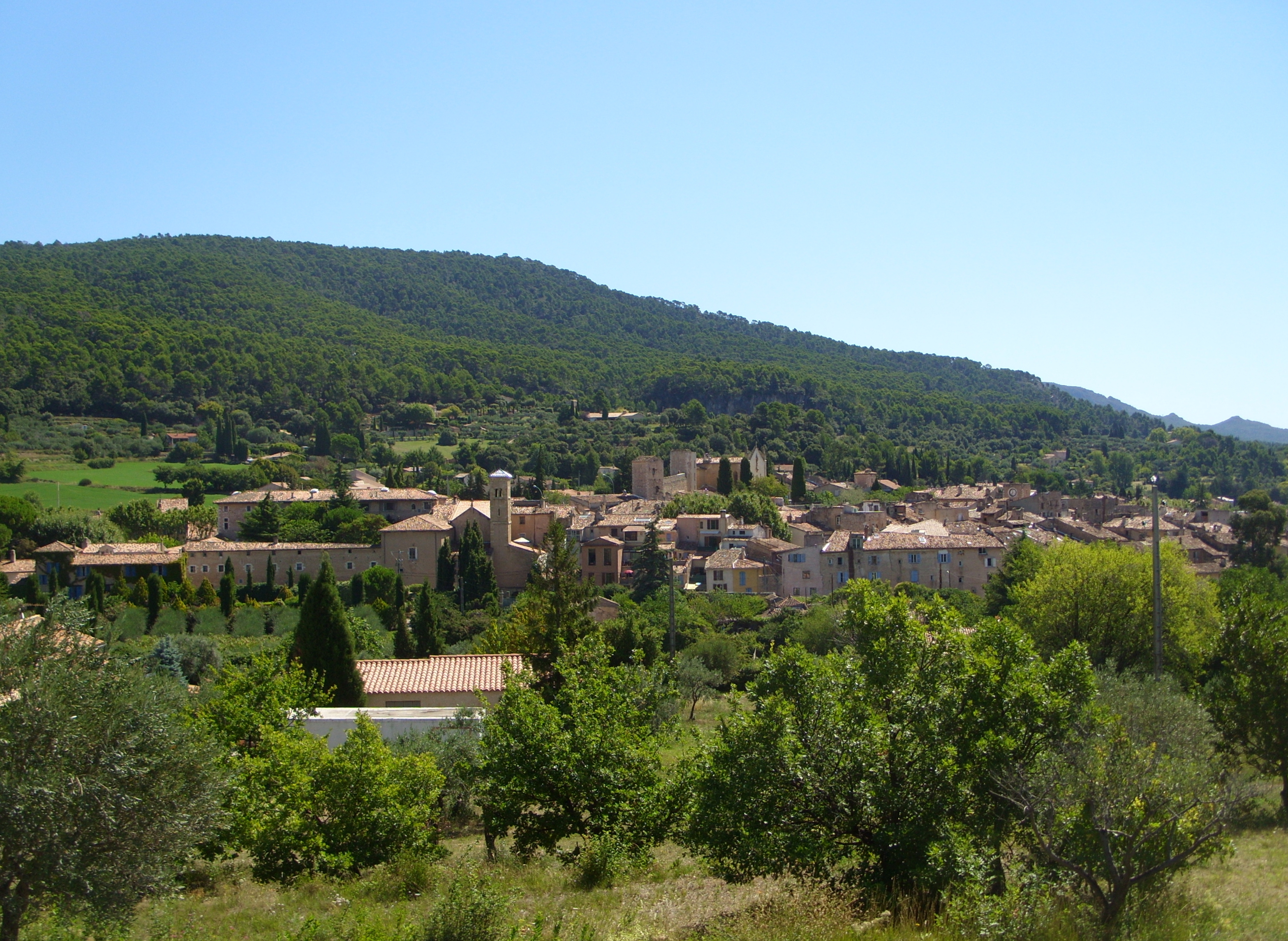
- View of Aups

- Coat of arms
- Location of Aups
- Location within France Location within Provence-Alpes-Côte d'Azur
- Coordinates: 43°37′42″N 6°13′29″E
- Country: France
- Region: Provence-Alpes-Côte d'Azur
- Department: Var
- Arrondissement: Brignoles
- Canton: Flayosc
- Intercommunality: CC Lacs Gorges Verdon

Government
  - Mayor (2020–2026): Antoine Faure
- Area^{1}: 64.15 km^{2} (24.77 sq mi)
- Elevation: 505 m (1,657 ft)
- Highest elevation: 1,077 m (3,533 ft)
- Lowest elevation: 390 m (1,280 ft)
- Population (2023): 2,192
  - Density: 34.17/km^{2} (88.50/sq mi)
- Time zone: UTC+01:00 (CET)
  - Summer (DST): UTC+02:00 (CEST)
- INSEE/Postal code: 83007 /83630
- ^{1} French Land Register data, which excludes lakes, ponds, glaciers > 1 km^{2} (0.386 sq mi or 247 acres) and river estuaries.

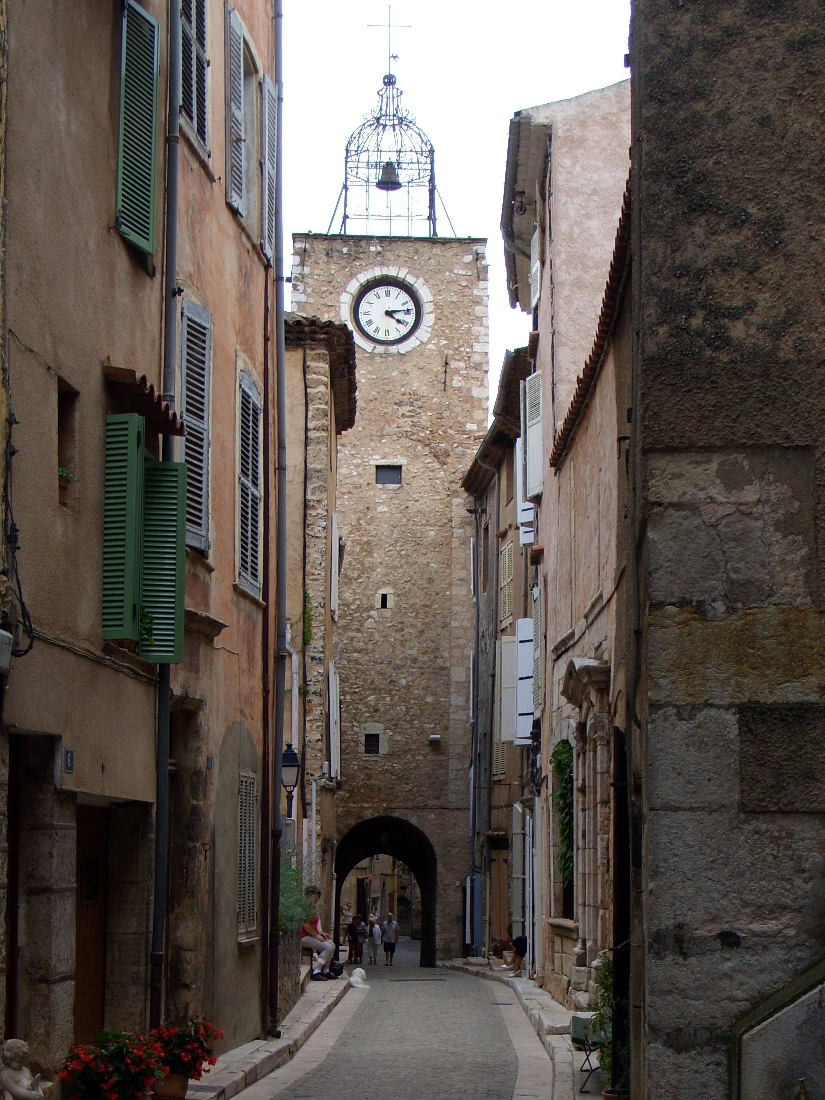
Rue de l'horloge (Clock Street)

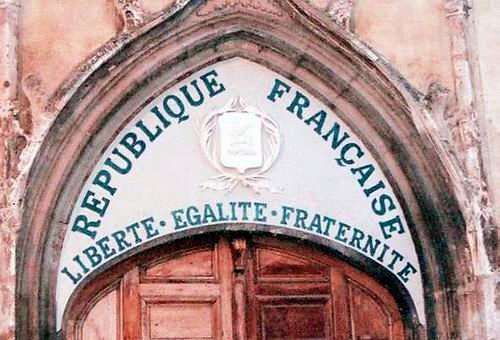
Entrance to the Collegiate Church of Saint Pancrace showing state ownership of the building

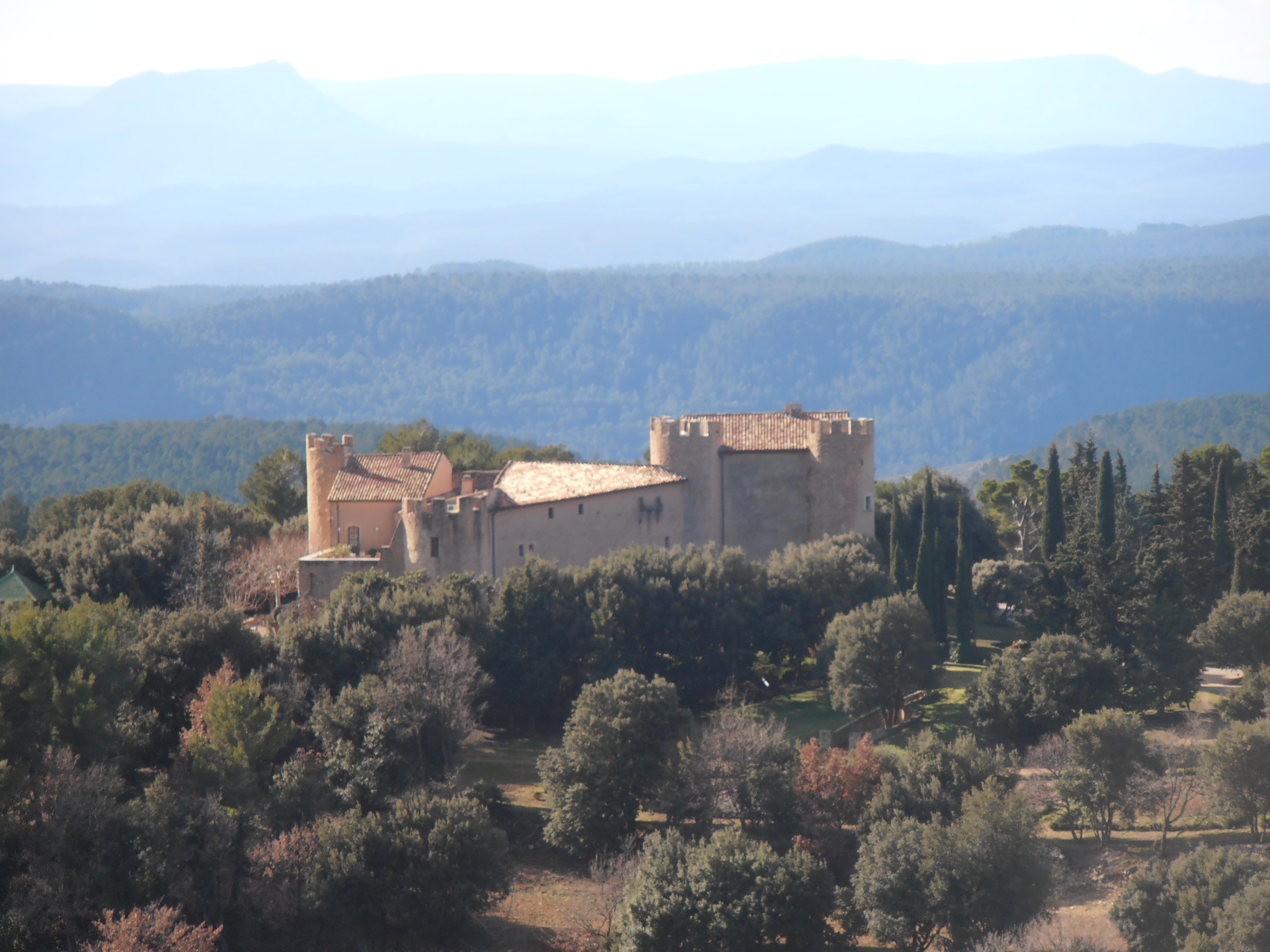
Château de Taurenne

Aups (French pronunciation: [ops]; Provençal Occitan: Aups in the classical norm, Aup in the Mistralian norm, pronounced [ˈaw]) is a commune in the Var department in the Provence-Alpes-Côte d'Azur region in southeastern France.

== Geography ==
Located in Provence at 500m alt, Aups is in the first foothills of the Alps. The town is at the gates of Verdon River, at 60 km from the sea and 80 km from the snow stations.
Aups is named Capital of Haut-Var and Capital of the truffle and was made a part of the Parc naturel régional du Verdon in 2000. Its typically Mediterranean climate makes the village a healthy place to live.

=== Climate ===
Aups has a hot-summer Mediterranean climate (Köppen climate classification Csa). The average annual temperature in Aups is 13.5 °C (56.3 °F). The average annual rainfall is 784.1 mm (30.87 in) with November as the wettest month. The temperatures are highest on average in July, at around 22.6 °C (72.7 °F), and lowest in January, at around 5.8 °C (42.4 °F). The highest temperature ever recorded in Aups was 40.1 °C (104.2 °F) on 28 June 2019; the coldest temperature ever recorded was −10.4 °C (13.3 °F) on 30 December 2005.

Climate data for Aups (1991−2020 normals, extremes 1993−present)
Month	Jan	Feb	Mar	Apr	May	Jun	Jul	Aug	Sep	Oct	Nov	Dec	Year
Record high °C (°F)	23.8 (74.8)	22.4 (72.3)	25.9 (78.6)	27.6 (81.7)	33.0 (91.4)	40.1 (104.2)	38.7 (101.7)	39.3 (102.7)	34.0 (93.2)	30.9 (87.6)	22.7 (72.9)	22.4 (72.3)	40.1 (104.2)
Mean daily maximum °C (°F)	10.6 (51.1)	11.7 (53.1)	15.1 (59.2)	17.9 (64.2)	22.1 (71.8)	26.9 (80.4)	30.2 (86.4)	30.0 (86.0)	24.7 (76.5)	19.7 (67.5)	14.1 (57.4)	11.0 (51.8)	19.5 (67.1)
Daily mean °C (°F)	5.8 (42.4)	6.2 (43.2)	9.0 (48.2)	11.8 (53.2)	15.8 (60.4)	19.9 (67.8)	22.6 (72.7)	22.5 (72.5)	18.2 (64.8)	14.3 (57.7)	9.3 (48.7)	6.5 (43.7)	13.5 (56.3)
Mean daily minimum °C (°F)	1.0 (33.8)	0.7 (33.3)	2.9 (37.2)	5.7 (42.3)	9.4 (48.9)	12.9 (55.2)	15.0 (59.0)	14.9 (58.8)	11.6 (52.9)	8.8 (47.8)	4.6 (40.3)	1.9 (35.4)	7.5 (45.5)
Record low °C (°F)	−9.2 (15.4)	−10.2 (13.6)	−10.1 (13.8)	−3.6 (25.5)	0.7 (33.3)	4.5 (40.1)	7.7 (45.9)	7.3 (45.1)	2.2 (36.0)	−3.5 (25.7)	−6.3 (20.7)	−10.4 (13.3)	−10.4 (13.3)
Average precipitation mm (inches)	56.8 (2.24)	42.4 (1.67)	40.3 (1.59)	75.8 (2.98)	72.4 (2.85)	56.5 (2.22)	22.6 (0.89)	46.7 (1.84)	75.1 (2.96)	102.9 (4.05)	125.1 (4.93)	67.5 (2.66)	784.1 (30.87)
Average precipitation days (≥ 1.0 mm)	5.6	5.0	5.4	7.9	7.4	4.7	3.0	4.3	5.5	6.7	8.4	6.3	70.1
Source: Météo-France

== History ==
The village was named Oppidum de Alpibus (town of the Alps) then Castrum de Alpibus (fortress of the Alps), castrum de Almis, then Alps and now Aups. The place was colonized by the Oxybians (a Ligurian tribe) during the time of Ancient Rome, near Via Aurelia going from Fréjus (Forum Julii) to Riez (Forum Reii). Julius Caesar visited Aups on his way to conquering Gaul. He is supposed to have said, « I would rather be the first man in Aups than the second in Rome ».

In 1574, the town was looted by the Huguenots, who massacred 18 residents. A statue called "Maiden of the Massacre" was erected on square where the massacre took place, in Clock Street.
Aups was the centre of the Var Republican insurgency in 1851 against the coup d'état of Napoleon III, and became known as the "Center of Red Var".

Aups was a stronghold of the French Resistance during World War II. The city earned the Croix de guerre avec palmes. It was liberated by American forces on 17 August 1944, two days after the Operation Dragoon landings to the south.

== Population ==
Historical population
Year	Pop.	±% p.a.
1968	1,488	—
1975	1,500	+0.11%
1982	1,652	+1.39%
1990	1,796	+1.05%
1999	1,903	+0.65%
2007	2,047	+0.92%
2012	2,113	+0.64%
2017	2,228	+1.07%
2023	2,192	−0.27%
Source: INSEE

== Tourism ==
=== Truffles ===
Aups has the third largest black truffle market of France, known for its quality and importance. This market is held every Thursday from November to February.

=== Provençal Market ===
There is a colourful Provençal market, every Wednesday and Saturday featuring local products and handicrafts.

=== Taurenne Castle ===
The Château de Taurenne is one of the last Var buildings dating from the Middle Ages. It once belonged to Baron Isnard, and is now home to an olive oil mill.

== People from Aups ==
- The Blacas house - an old Provençal house, lords and dukes of Aups since the 12th century
- Pierre Petit (1832–1909) - photographer
- General Jean-Baptiste Girard (1775–1815) - Général and baron d'Empire who fought the Napoleonic Wars.
- Pierre Yovanovitch - Interior Designer - Chateau de Fabrègues - a 17th-century castle in Provence all renovated by the designer

== See also ==
- Communes of the Var department
- Château de Taurenne website.
- Château de Taurenne - photographs of the property
