= Françoise de Soissan de La Bédosse =

French noblewoman

- Born: 1631
- Died: May 2, 1699 (aged 67–68)
- Other names: Lady of Rus
- Spouse(s): Esprit de Rafélis and Pierre Arnoul
- Children: Joseph-Horace de Rafélis and Pierre-Dominique de Rafélis
- Parents: Jacques de Soissan (father); Jeanne de Soyans (mother)

Françoise de Soissan de La Bédosse (1631 – 2 May 1699), often referred to as Lady of Rus was a French noblewoman involved in various intrigues and sometimes considered by some of her contemporaries to be a witch.

She was likely the result of an extramarital relationship. She was married to Esprit de Rafélis and had two sons. In the 1660s, she commenced employment with Armand-Charles de La Meilleraye, Duke of Mazarin, and his wife Hortense Mancini. During the trial of Nicolas Fouquet, she placed one of her cousins, Pierre de Roquesante, who was a judge at the trial, in a compromising position.

Around 1670, she initiated a romantic relationship with the Count of Suze, which led to her acquiring land from him. From 1673 onwards, she had a significant influence over the family of the naval intendant Pierre Arnoul. She married her sons from her first marriage to Pierre Arnoul’s mother and sister before marrying him herself. She managed the family’s finances and amassed considerable wealth.

There is a suggestion that she may have been involved in the story of François Michel, a farrier who claimed to have seen a ghost and obtained an audience with Louis XIV to deliver a message he said he was charged with conveying. However, there is no evidence to support this claim. Some recent authors have suggested that this story resulted from a plot devised by Françoise de Soissan to persuade Louis XIV to make his marriage to the Marquise de Maintenon public. There is no evidence to suggest this.

To explain Françoise de Soissan’s impressive influence, especially given that her power did not wane with age, some contemporaries suggested witchcraft. Early 20th-century historians portrayed her as an unscrupulous adventuress. Today, she is seen more as a shrewd and strategic businesswoman.

== Biography ==
Françoise de Soissan de La Bédosse was originally known as Françon. Her official father was Jacques de Soissan (or Soussan or Sausan), a disinherited nobleman who held the roles of bailiff and governor of Alès and seigneur of La Bédosse, a locality in what is now Cendras, near Alès. Her mother was Jeanne de Soyans, from a noble family based in Beaumes in the Comtat Venaissin. Jacques de Soissan and Jeanne de Soyans married in 1630.

Upon his return from Paris, Jacques de Soissan discovered that his wife had given birth to a daughter, Françon, who was baptized on 27 October 1631. According to the baptism record, the child was two months old at the time, which would have made Jacques her biological father. It is more probable that the biological father was César de La Tour du Pin, husband of Jacques' sister (and future grandfather of Philis de La Charce). This is the accusation made by the latter. Françon was brought up at Château de Mirabel in the family of César de La Tour du Pin and then in a convent in Carpentras. Her father disinherited her and subsequently engaged in a lengthy legal dispute to reclaim her inheritance. She ultimately relinquished her claim in 1662 in exchange for 1,500 livres in compensation.

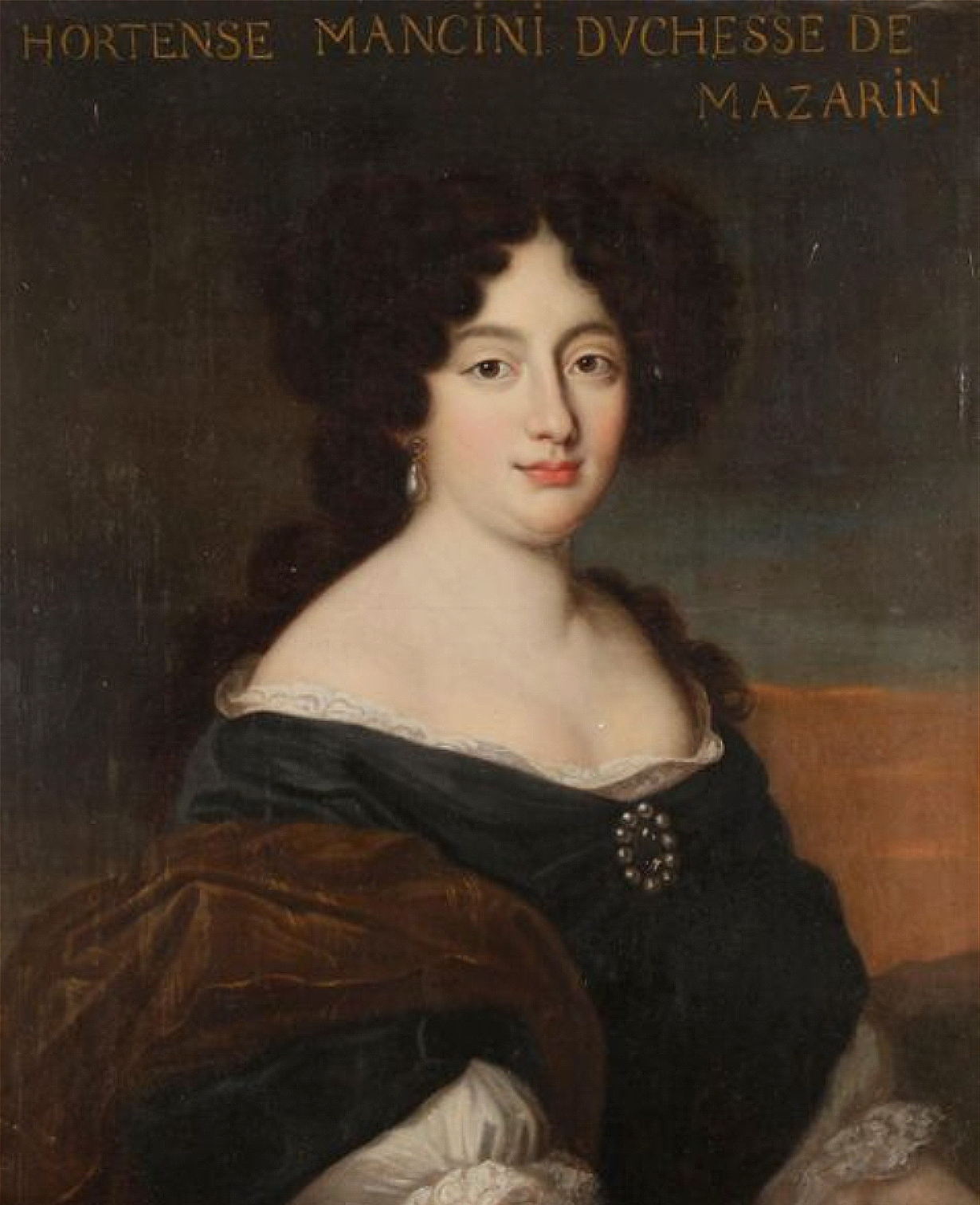
Portrait of Hortense Mancini by Carlo Maratta

In 1649, Françon entered into a marital partnership with Esprit de Rafélis (circa 1630–1686), who held the title of seigneur of Rus or Ruth, a locality situated within the present-day commune of Lagarde-Paréol. She began to be known as Françoise. Esprit de Rafélis was a military man who served in Turenne's army and during the Fronde. He held the rank of artillery lieutenant in Bourg-en-Bresse. He was the second consul of Carpentras, governor of Buis-les-Baronnies, and later ship captain.

Esprit de Rafélis and Françoise de La Bédosse had two sons:

- Joseph-Horace, born in 1650, seigneur of Saint-Sauveur et du Villard (in the present day Saint-Sauveur-Gouvernet), captain in the guards of the Duc de Mazarin.
- Pierre-Dominique, born in 1652, Captain of the Royal Galley, Knight of Saint-Maurice and Saint-Lazare.

There is evidence that they resided separately after that. Françoise de Soissan, subsequently known as the Lady of Rus, entered the employment of Armand-Charles de La Meilleraye, Duc de Mazarin, and his wife Hortense Mancini, niece and heiress of Cardinal Mazarin, during a court visit to the south of France in 1660. Françoise gained the confidence of the Duc de Mazarin and secured a pension of 1,600 livres. She was subsequently dispatched to England to persuade the Duc's wife to return to France, where she had fled due to her husband's jealousy.

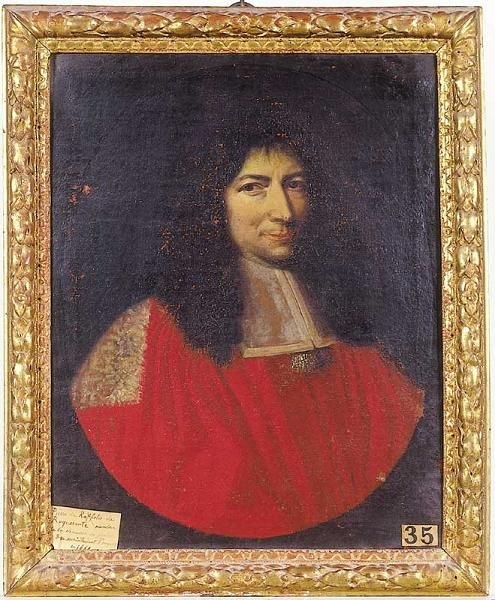
Pierre de Roquesante

Additionally, Lady of Rus was engaged in the proceedings against Nicolas Fouquet, the superintendent of finances. One of the judges was Pierre de Roquesante, a cousin of Esprit de Rafélis. Similarly, he defied Louis XIV's orders by voting for exile instead of capital punishment in December 1664, a stance that resonated with a portion of the public. Françoise de Soissan resided with Pierre de Roquesante. To facilitate Roquesante's access, the government ordered Lady of Rus' exile to Provence due to her intrigue involvement. Despite Roquesante's objections, Françoise is permitted to return to Paris. She then attempts to leverage Roquesante's influence to protect financiers facing potential prosecution by the Chamber of Justice. Per the king's orders, Roquesante is exiled to Quimper, where he is held responsible for the intrigues of the dame de Rus.

Françoise de Soissan also established a business relationship with the bishop of Viviers, Louis-François de La Baume de Suze, and his nephews, including Louis-François Count de Suze. The connection between the Comte de Suze and the Lady of Rus was solid, possibly because of an extramarital relationship. In 1670, she secured a series of rural properties from him, causing financial difficulties for his legitimate wife despite the intervention of the Bishop of Viviers to support the latter. To explain the extent of Françoise's influence on her lover, the idea arose that she was using witchcraft. Françoise de Soissan subsequently became associated with the Arnoul family. In Digne in 1673, she met Nicolas Arnoul, intendant of the navy, and his wife Geneviève Saulger, with whom she formed a favorable impression. She apparently persuaded the Comte de Suze to donate all of his property to them. Their son, Pierre Arnoul, did not revoke this donation until 1680.

=== The hold over the Arnoul family ===
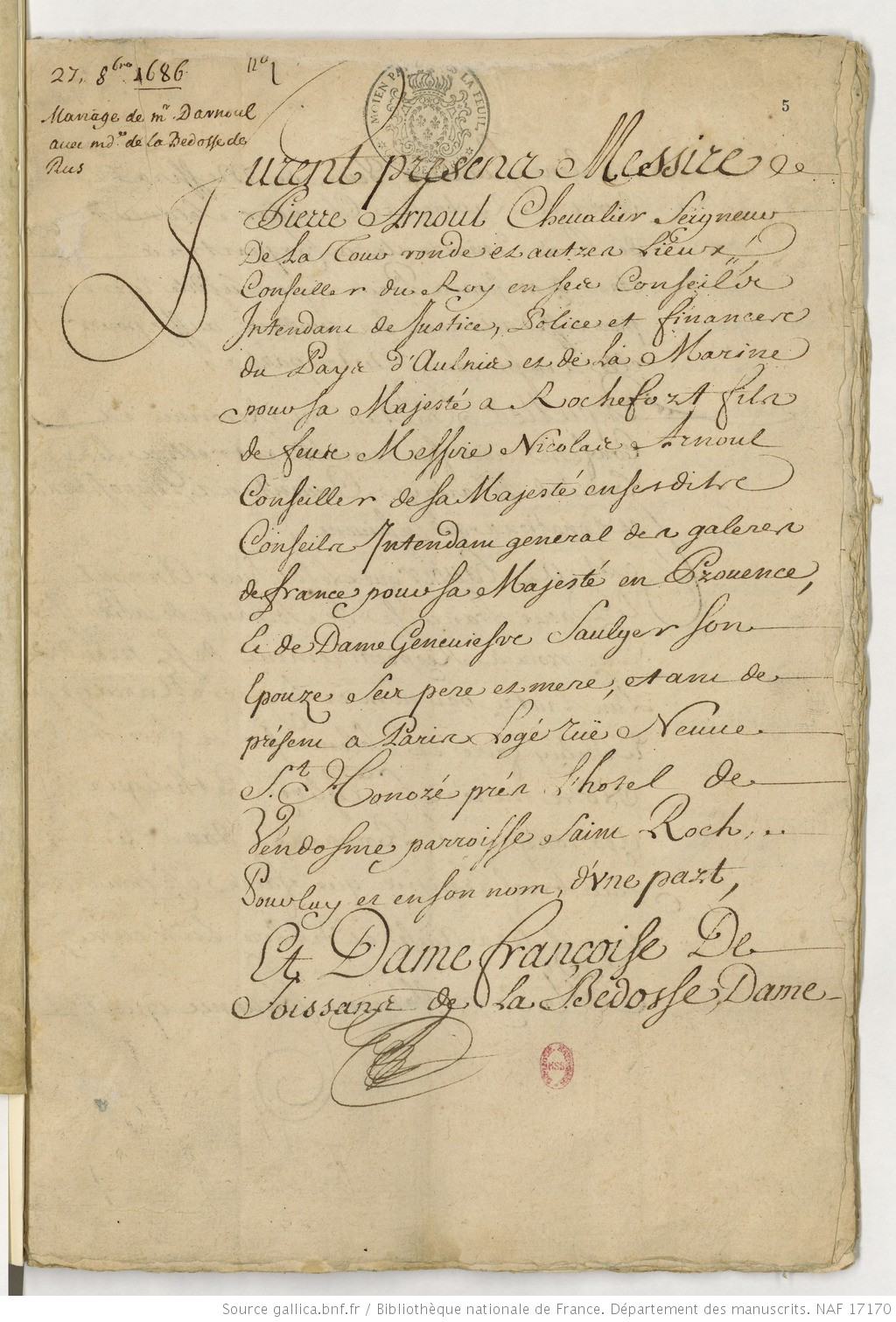
Marriage contract between Pierre Arnoul and Françoise de Soissan de La Bédosse, October 27, 1686

In 1674, Nicolas Arnoul suffered a cerebral hemorrhage. The Lady of Rus assisted Geneviève Saulger in caring for the paralyzed patient and efficiently assumed control of the Arnoul household.

Following Nicolas Arnoul's passing on October 18, 1674, Pierre Arnoul and his mother entrusted the management of the family business to Françoise de Soissan, who did not miss the opportunity to improve her financial position.

As the widow Arnoul, then in her fifties, seemed to develop a preference for younger men, Françoise convinced her in 1676 to remarry her eldest son, Joseph-Horace, aged twenty-six.

Four years later, in 1680, Françoise married her second son, Pierre-Dominique, to Geneviève Arnoul, daughter of Genevière Saulger and Nicolas Arnoul. When Françoise was widowed in 1686, she remarried, this time to Pierre Arnoul, son of Geneviève Arnoul and Nicolas Arnoul and brother of Geneviève Arnoul. He was thirty-five, while Françoise was fifty-five. Despite warnings from Minister Seignelay, Pierre Arnoul's superior, these marriages proceeded.

As a result of these three marriages, Françoise became both the mother-in-law of her eldest son and the sister-in-law of her youngest son. Joseph-Horace de Rafélis, her eldest son, became the father-in-law of his mother and brother. Pierre-Dominique de Rafélis, Françoise’s youngest son, became his mother’s brother-in-law, his brother’s son-in-law, and his sister-in-law’s son-in-law. Geneviève Saulger died in 1683, and her young widower subsequently married Catherine des Isnard.

Françoise de Soissan died on May 2, 1699, following a two-week period of intense suffering. In her will, she appointed Capuchin monks with missions in Rochegude, Saint-Sauveur, and Beaumes. She also bequeathed the seigneury of Ruth (in Lagarde-Paréol, near Orange), which she had inherited from her first husband to Pierre Arnoul and herself. They used the funds to establish an institution that combined pious and charitable activities. They financed the installation of "solitaries," or hermits, who took in children and trained them in manual labor.

In a memoir written for a lawsuit against his sister Geneviève, Pierre Arnoul describes Françoise de Soissan's influence on the entire family. He even references the idea of the devil's influence. However, he also acknowledges the excellent management qualities of the lady of Rus and admits to having benefited from them.

=== The Lady of Rus, the Marquise de Maintenon and the farrier ===
The refusal of Roquesante to condemn Fouquet to death gave rise to the hypothesis that Lady of Rus may have been part of Fouquet's financial entourage. This would have allowed her to make contact with Françoise d'Aubigny, who would later become Madame de Maintenon. This hypothesis has yet to be proven. In 1749, a supplement to Louis Moréri's Dictionnaire Historique referenced a farrier named François Michel who secured an audience with Louis XIV to deliver a message from a ghost. The article was included in the revised edition of the Dictionnaire, published in 1759. The meeting between the blacksmith and the king, though unexpected, did occur. The author of the dictionary entry, the oratorian Joseph Bourgerel, views it as a potential conspiracy.

It is thought that Mme de Rus, an intriguing figure, staged this comedy to facilitate the marriage of Mme de Maintenon and the king.

By the end of the 18th century, Jean-Baptiste Rolland, known as Father Calixte, asserted that this hypothesis was irrefutable. It is believed that François Michel was used by Lady of Rus as a pawn in her efforts to persuade Louis XIV to formalize his marriage to Madame de Maintenon. However, the author's only evidence is hearsay. In his 1844 publication, Louis XIV et son siècle, Alexandre Dumas employs the same characters—the blacksmith, the Marquise de Maintenon, and Lady of Rus, who is referred to as Armond instead of Arnoul—and follows a similar narrative arc. He drew inspiration from Saint-Simon's Memoirs.

Despite Paul de Faucher's assertion at the end of the 19th century that Françoise de Soissan played a definitive role in this affair, there is no concrete evidence of a relationship between Lady of Rus and Madame de Maintenon, according to Lucien Bély.

== Witch, adventurer and businesswoman ==
Some of her contemporaries suggested that she used witchcraft to explain Françoise de Soissan's influence. On January 17, 1680, the Marquise de Sévigné wrote to her daughter.

I told him on Monday morning that I'd been thinking all night about a Madame de Rus, but I didn't understand where this idea had come from, and I wanted to ask you about this witch. It's a strange story to see a man so in love with this creature as to lose his fortune; I can't tell you anything so extraordinary, but that's how she makes herself loved.

— Marie de Rabutin-Chantal, marchioness of Sevigné, Letters from Madame de Sévigné, her family and friends, 772

Following the death of his wife, Pierre Arnoul accused her of employing methods inspired by the devil. Saint-Simon, in his Mémoires, offers a balanced assessment of Françoise de Soissan, acknowledging her expertise while also highlighting shortcomings. Ultimately, he addresses the issue of witchcraft.

There was in Marseilles a Madam Arnoul, whose life is a novel, and who, ugly as sin, and old, poor, and a widow, made the greatest passions, governed the most considerable of the places where she found herself, got herself married by this Mr. Arnoul, intendant of the navy in Marseilles, with the most singular circumstances, and, by dint of wit and maneuvering, made herself loved and feared wherever she lived, to the point that most believed her to be a witch.

— Louis de Rouvroy, Duke of Saint-Simon, Mémoires, volume 2, 18

It is plausible that Saint-Simon perused Lettres historiques et galantes by the journalist Anne-Marguerite Petit du Noyer, who characterizes Françoise de Soissan as an "enchantress." Madame Dunoyer states that the Lady Rus wrote the Mémoires of Hortense Mancini, sometimes attributed to Saint-Réal. She highlights that it is noteworthy to have known how to foster such passionate and enduring love in an era when such sentiments were often met with disdain. She offers a straightforward rationale for this phenomenon:

There is a divergence of opinion as to the character of this individual. Some view her as a witch, while others regard her as a saint. My own assessment is that she is neither, but rather a shrewd and capable woman who has enjoyed the benefit of good fortune.

In the latter half of the 19th century and the early decades of the 20th, Françoise de Soissan was regarded as a shrewd and unscrupulous adventurer. Paul de Faucher highlights her strategic thinking and resourcefulness. Louis Delavaud portrays her as a strategist who exploits the Arnoul family's credulity and determination while acknowledging her ability to influence and persevere. In Gaston Rambert's view, she is shrewd and opportunistic but persuasive without excessive display. Paul-Marie Bondois asserts that the Arnoul family is vulnerable to exploitation by the lady of Rus, who controls their wealth.

In 2021, historian Lucien Bély characterized Françoise de Soissan as an ambitious and capable businesswoman. She was skilled at gaining others' trust, engaged in influence peddling, and exerted control over an entire family. She provided financial assistance, participated in over three hundred notarial transactions, and adeptly used legal proceedings to enhance her financial standing. Françoise managed the affairs of her second husband, who allowed her to do so due to his preoccupation with his duties as naval intendant. She demonstrated exceptional administrative abilities, acquiring seigneuries such as Saint-Sauveur and Rochegude.

== See also ==
=== Bibliography ===
- Bély, Lucien (2021). Louis XIV, le fantôme et le maréchal-ferrant (in French). Paris: Presses universitaires de France. ISBN 978-2130827474.
- Delavaud, Louis (1912). Les établissements religieux et hospitaliers à Rochefort 1683-1715 (in French). La Rochelle.
- Faucher, Paul de (1895). Un des juges de Fouquet. Roquesante (1619–1707), sa famille, ses descendants. Mémoires de l'académie des sciences, agriculture, arts et belles-lettres d'Aix (in French). pp. 157–429.
- Rambert, Gaston (1925). Une aventurière à Marseille et à Toulon au XVIIe siècle. La dame de Rus. Bulletin de la société de statistiques de Marseille (in French). pp. 10–29, 159–169.
- Courtois, Raymond de (1882). Les justices seigneuriales. Mœurs et coutumes d'autrefois. Bulletin historique et archéologique de Vaucluse (in French). pp. 417–468.
- Dessert, Daniel (1987). Fouquet (in French). Fayard. ISBN 978-2213017051.
- Tennevin, Jean-Pierre (1990). François Michel de Salon-de-Provence. Le maréchal-ferrant reçu par Louis XIV (in French). Marcel Petit.
- Moréri, Louis (1759). Le grand dictionnaire historique ou Le mélange curieux de l'histoire sacrée et profane (in French). Slatkine reprints.
- Dumas, Alexandre (1851). Louis XIV et son siécle (in French). Paris: Chez Marescq.
- Monmerqué, Louis (1862). Lettres de Madame de Sévigné, de sa famille et de ses amis (in French). Hachette Livre BNF.
- Chéruel, Adolphe (1856). Mémoires complets et authentiques du duc de Saint-Simon sur le siècle de Louis XIV et la Régence (in French). Vol. 2. Paris: L. Hachette.
- Bondois, Paul-Marie (1934). L'industrie sucrière française à la fin du XVIIe siècle. Les projets de l'intendant Pierre Arnoul (in French). Vol. 22. Revue d'histoire économique et sociale. JSTOR 24066974.
