= Officier de plume =

Class of French naval officer under the ancien régime

In the French Navy of the ancien régime, officiers de plume (literally pen officers) were naval officers who worked in administrative roles in ports and colonies. The French navy's officer corps comprised officiers de plume and officiers d'épée (literally sword officers), the latter of whom engaged in active combat roles.

In the 18th century the French Navy's expanded need for manpower led to the creation of a third type of naval officer, the "officier des classes", who was in charge of recruiting sailors for the navy. Also, the old galley corps (corps des galères) existed up until 1748, with its own administrators - thus one would not confuse a commissaire ordinaire of the galleys, who would be a member of the galley corps, with a commissaire ordinaire of the navy, who would be a member of the corps de plume. Up to the 17th century, a corps of naval artillery officers had existed, but this was abolished at the start of the 18th century.

== Related articles ==
- Pierre Arnoul

== Sources ==
- Asselinm Jean-François, Le corps des officiers de plume dans la marine royale au XVIIIe siècle à travers l'étude de l'arsenal de Rochefort, Mémoire de maîtrise, dirigé par Michel Vergé-Franceschi. Paris IV-Sorbonne, 2000. (in French)
