= Jean Baptiste Colbert, Marquis of Seignelay =

French politician

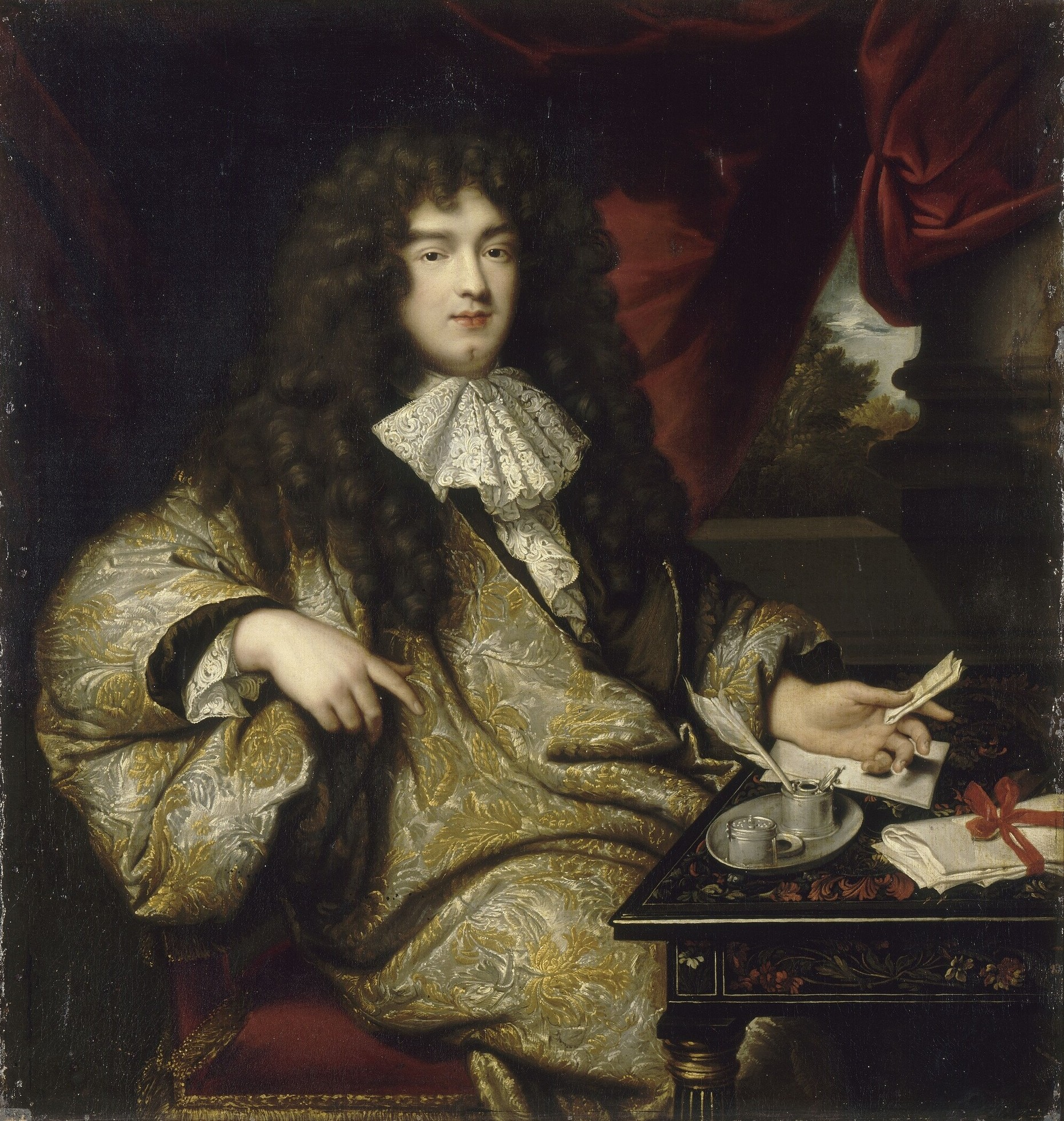
Jean-Baptiste Antoine Colbert, Marquis de Seignelay

Jean-Baptiste Antoine Colbert, Marquis of Seignelay (French pronunciation: [ʒɑ̃ batist ɑ̃twan kɔlbɛʁ]; 1 November 1651 – 3 November 1690) was a French politician. He was the eldest son of Jean-Baptiste Colbert, nephew of Charles Colbert de Croissy and cousin of Jean-Baptiste Colbert de Torcy.

== Life ==
Seignelay married twice; firstly to Marie Marguerite d'Alegre, who died in 1678, and then to Catherine de Goyon (1662–1699). Catherine was a daughter of Henri Goyon and Marie Françoise Le Tellier, herself a sister of François Michel Le Tellier de Louvois. Their four children included:

1. Marie Jean Baptiste Colbert (known as Jean Baptiste) (1683–1712)
2. Théodore Alexandre Colbert (known as Théodore) (1690?–1695?)

Catherine later married again to Charles de Lorraine, Count of Marsan, a member of the powerful princely House of Lorraine. She died in childbirth in December 1699.

On the death of his father in 1683, Seignelay was named Navy Secretary by Louis XIV and held the post until his death. He accompanied Abraham Duquesne at the bombardment of Genoa in May 1684. He completed the Code Noir begun by his father. He was named Minister in 1689.

Seignelay continued his father's work of expanding the French Navy; between 1660 and 1690 the Navy increased under their control from 18 sailing vessels to some 125. While the arsenals too were reconstructed, modern studies criticise the Colberts, father and son, for concentrating on ships rather than infrastructure.

In 1675, Nicolas Boileau dedicated his ninth epistle, Nothing is beautiful but the truth, to Siegnelay and he was named Grand Treasurer of the Order of the Holy Spirit. In 1683, he inherited the Château de Sceaux, which he improved, employing the services of Jules Hardouin Mansart.

He was succeeded as Navy Minister by Louis Phélypeaux, Marquis of Phélypeaux.

== See also ==
- Pierre Arnoul

== Sources ==
- Laurent Dingli, Colbert, marquis de Seignelay. Le fils flamboyant , Paris, éditions Perrin, 1997
- Jean-Philippe Zanco, Dictionnaire des Ministres de la Marine 1689-1958, S.P.M. Kronos, Paris 2011.
