= Bagne (penal establishment) =

Place for forced labor in French penal colonies

In French history, bagne [baɲ] is a term used to describe a penal establishment where forced labor was enforced. These establishments were typically in penal colonies or galleys where there were the port bagnes (or maritime bagnes). Not all convicts in the penal system were sentenced to forced labor.

The word "bagne" comes from the Italian bagno, name of a prison in Livorno built on the site of a therma, an ancient Roman Bathhouse.

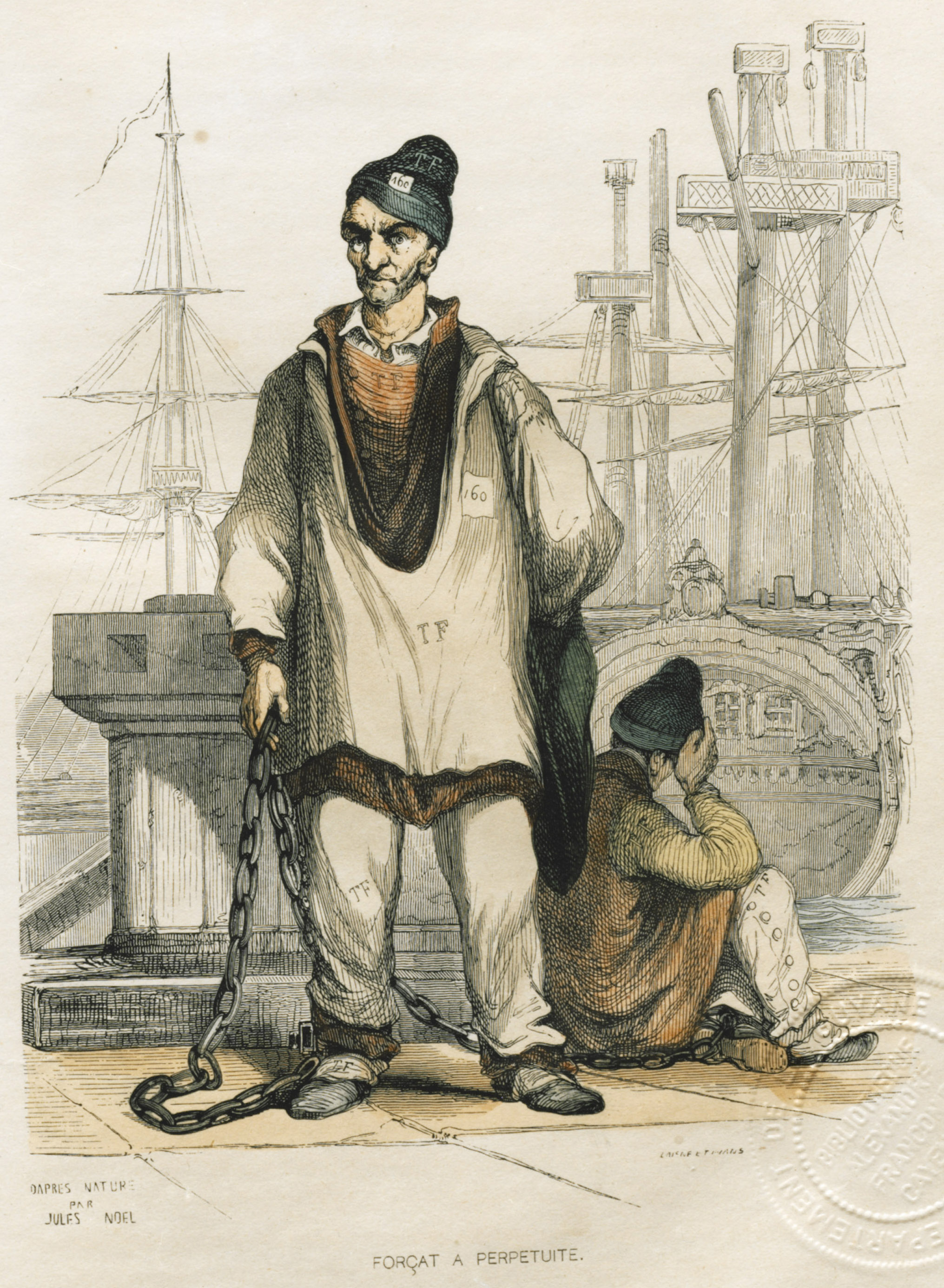
Bagnard, from a Bagne of Toulon (Musée du Bagne, Fort Balaguier, Toulon).

== History ==
The galleys were originally port bagnes (or maritime bagnes), which explains why part of the vocabulary of bagne and the prison comes from the vocabulary of the galley slaves.

French colonial bagnes were established by a series of decrees in 1852 and 1853, supplemented by the Transportation Act of 1854. They were only abolished in 1938 (transportation to a bagne by deportation), and definitively abolished in 1945 (detention in a bagne). However, the last prisoners had to complete their sentences and were not released until 1953.

=== Royal galleys ===
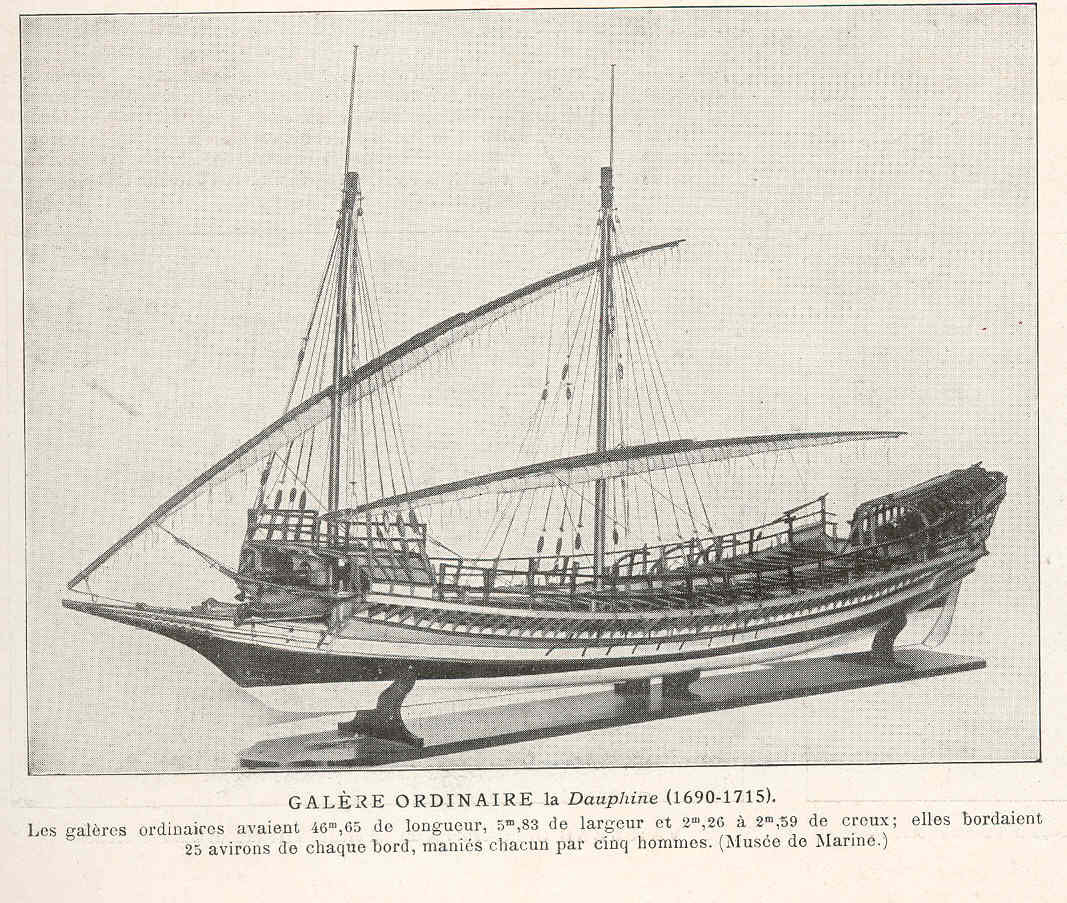
Galère ordinaire la Dauphine (1690–1715)

In France, the use of convicts as rowers on the royal galleys dates back to Jacques Cœur in the 15th century. The penalty of the galleys was systematically applied from Louis XIV onwards, under the impetus of Colbert, and particularly after 1685 to eradicate Protestantism following the Edict of Fontainebleau. The Galleys's arsenal was located in Marseille. The galleys were the first penitentiary system to be organized on a kingdom-wide scale. With the September 27, 1748 decree, Louis XV abolished the galley corps.

=== Bagnes harbor ===
Disembarked galley slaves, known as chrome, were then assigned to the port bagnes (except galley slaves selected for rowing) and were required to work in the Navy's ports and arsenals. The Toulon bagne, the Brest bagne and the Rochefort bagne were created for this purpose.

=== Attachment of the Galères Corps to the Royal Navy ===
The Galères Royales, headed by a galley general independent of the Admiral of France and served by a special corps, was originally based in Marseille where all the prison facilities were located until the middle of the eighteenth century. The rowers generally remained on board when the galleys stayed in Toulon. But in 1748, Louis XV decreed the abolition of the Galères corps and their attachment to the Royal Navy.

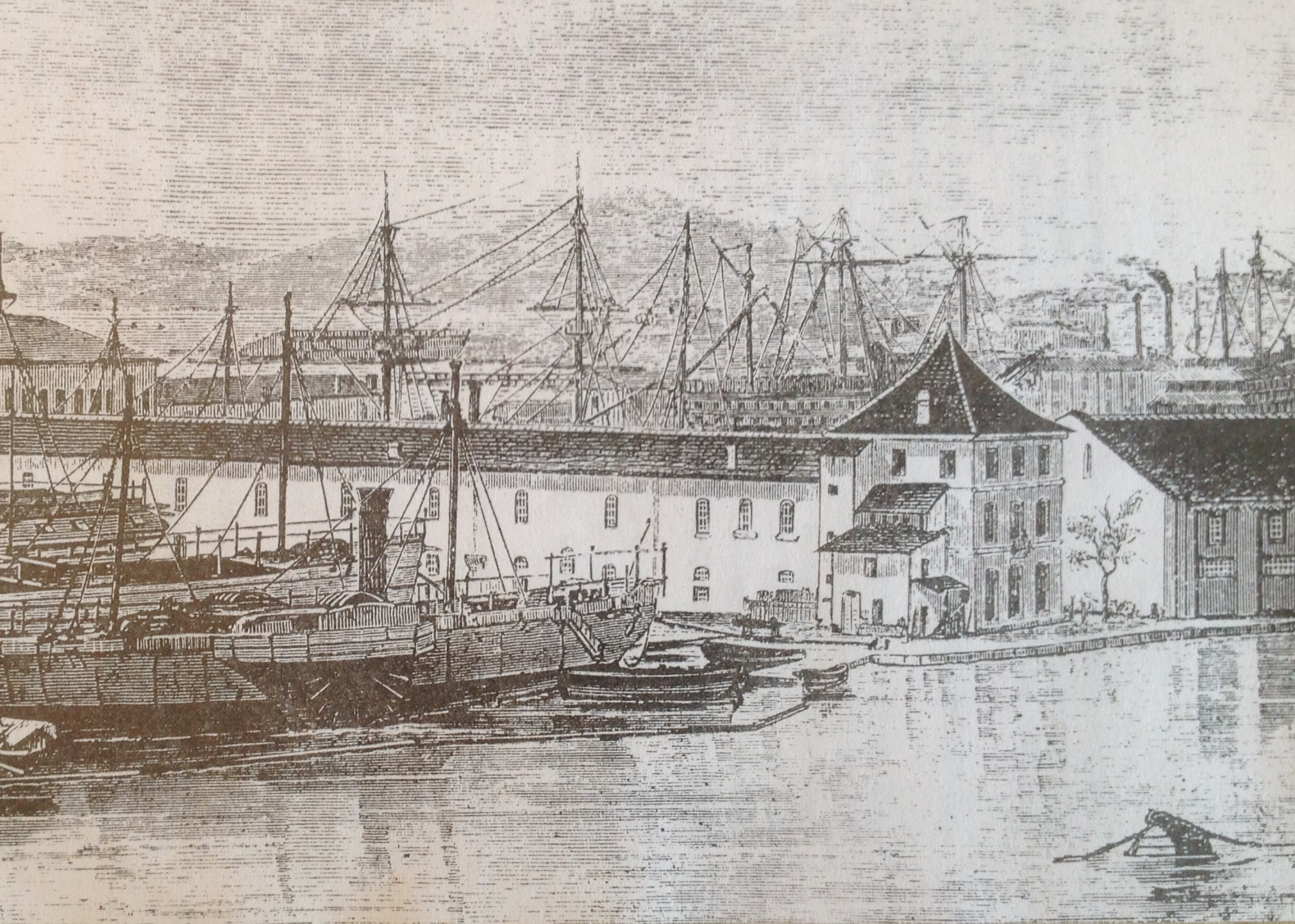
Toulon penal colony, mid-19th century

Toulon became the base for the galleys that left Marseille for good, as its penal colony was abolished. From then on, Toulon had to house the convicts. At first, this was done on the galleys, to which vessels were added, and which came to be known as floating bagnes. By the end of the 18th century, there were some 3,000 convicts in Toulon. They were mainly employed in heavy labor, earthworks, and construction, in the Arsenal and even in town. The convicts' clothing, consisting of a cap and a habit, differed in color according to the nature and reason for their sentence. Under the Ancien régime, convicts were branded with red iron. One foot was encircled by a ring fitted with a chain to immobilize them. The "toughest" were chained two by two; the ball and chain was a disciplinary punishment, along with caning with rope. These punishments gradually eased. Food, which included little meat and a ration of wine for the workers, was mostly based on dried vegetables, hence the name "gourgane" ("beans" in Provençal) given to their guards.

Due to the poor sanitary conditions, in 1777, a hospital was set up in the casemates of the southeast rampart of Darse Vauban, where additional buildings were erected against the rampart. Then, in 1797, the hospital moved to a huge 200-meter-long building, oriented north–south, built-in 1783 along the western quay of the Vieille Darse, called the "Grand Rang". This building had a vast vaulted first floor with three bays; the hospital occupied the first floor. Two square corner towers with pyramidal roofs completed the north and south sides; the convicts' chapel was housed in the northern tower. The rest of the building was used for administrative services. The able-bodied convicts had been housed where the hospital used to be. In 1814, they were moved to a 115-meter-long east–west building, perpendicular to the hospital, built in 1783 on the south-west quay of the Vieille Darse, between the Chaîne Vieille de la passe and the Grand Rang. Nearby, a ship known as the "Admiral" was moored to guard the channel and fire the morning and evening cannons.

==== Arsenal and the penal colony ====
Attaching the penal colony to the navy made it easier to organize the workforce. Equipping and fitting out a first-rank vessel (over 100 guns, 3 decks) cost an average of 1 million livres tournois, or around 150 million euros today. (Note: A livre tournois in 1720 corresponded to 0.31 grams of pure gold, and the Franc germinal from 1805 to 1914 to 0.322 5 g of pure gold.) Successive conflicts (the Seven Years' War, the American War of Independence, and then the Revolutionary and Napoleonic wars) forced France to try to compete with the British fleet. The development of galleys in the arsenals of Toulon, Cherbourg, Brest, and Rochefort was directly linked to the need for forced labor to build and rebuild the French fleet. Although rare, galleys continued to be used during the Revolution, as demonstrated by the law of August 22, 1790, which imposed the penalty on thieves or carriers ashore of a ship's ammunition worth more than fifty francs. Some prisoners were convicted under the Ancien régime, with the penal code of 1791.

From the time of the Directoire and then the Empire, there was a return to a policy of repression. The number of convicts rose from 4,000 in 1795 to 10,000 in 1812. The 1810 Penal Code transformed the galley sentence into an iron penalty. This sentence did not change the way convict labor was carried out in the arsenals. It wasn't until the transportation policy was introduced in 1850 that the French prison system changed.

=== Colonial bagnes ===
==== Transportation to the colonies ====
From the 1840s onwards, politicians wanted to remove criminals from France. This policy of transportation began with the military prisons (disciplinary companies) set up in Algeria at the start of the colonial conquest. This transfer was justified by promoting the colony's development, which transformed it into a penal colony.

The law of May 27, 1885, introduced relegation for repeat offenders, leading to "perpetual internment on the territory of French colonies or possessions": after their sentence, convicted repeat offenders could not return to metropolitan France. They must serve a double sentence of relegation equivalent to the duration of their hard labor sentence. This is known as "doubling". Convicts refer to each other as "toughs", "those below", "crowbars", or "those above", to distinguish between first-time offenders ("toughs") and repeat offenders ("those above"). The prison administration does not mix them. This would refer to the location of each group in the holds (top or bottom) of the prison ship (the Loire, then the Martinière) making the Atlantic crossing.

The maritime bagnes were then transferred to Cayenne in 1852, and to New Caledonia in 1864, at a time when the Navy was switching from sail to steam, making the need for manpower less important. This transfer was also because convicts from mainland France were taking work away from honest workers and were considered too dangerous to be kept in the country (police reports point to a relaxation of discipline in the maritime convict colonies). It was against this backdrop of European imperialism that Napoleon III instituted colonial penal colonies with the law of May 30, 1854, article 1 of which stipulates that "in future, the penalty of hard labor will be served in establishments created by decree of the Emperor, on the territory of one or more French possessions other than Algeria. Nevertheless, in the event of an impediment to the transfer of convicts, and until such impediment has ceased, the sentence will be temporarily served in France".

In 1836, the Toulon prison had 4,305 inmates, 1,193 of whom were sentenced to life: 174 to over 20 years, 382 to between 16 and 20 years, 387 to between 11 and 15 years, 1,469 to between 5 and 10 years and 700 to less than 5 years. Many famous convicts spent time here, including Vidocq in 1799, Marie Lafarge in 1840, and the impostor Pierre Coignard. As for Jean Valjean, he was Victor Hugo's imagination. The Toulon penal colony ceased to exist in 1873. Its buildings were distributed among various military services involved in coastal defense, including the Centre d'études de la Marine and the Artillerie de côte. They survived until 1944 when they were almost destroyed.

On September 4, 1891, the implementing decree on prison disciplinary regulations prohibited convicts from receiving any remuneration for their work. However, after the publication of the decree, convicts (the lightest sentences and transported prisoners who had completed their sentence) continued to receive a salary when they worked for the prison administration. They can also work on their account.

==== Sentence categories in French Guiana ====
Under the Second Empire and the Third Republic, deportation was reserved for spies, political activists, and traitors (Alfred Dreyfus, though subsequently found innocent, was sentenced to deportation). As French political prisoners, deportees were not required to work. This was not the case for prisoners from the colonies. Transportation applied to convicts sentenced to forced labor. It was accompanied by doubling the sentence: anyone sentenced to less than 8 years of hard labor had to reside in the colony for a period equal to that of the sentence, under house arrest.

After 1868, the cost of the return journey to France or North Africa remained the responsibility of the convict. However, due to the lack of work in the region, most released convicts were rarely able to pay for their return. For sentences of hard labor exceeding eight years: after serving their sentence, convicts were assigned to reside in the colony for the rest of their lives. Convicts were divided into categories (law of May 1854):

- transported 1st class: sentenced to hard labor.
- transported 2nd class: sentenced to imprisonment.
- transported 3rd class, 1st section: convicts in breach of the law.
- transported 3rd class, 2nd section: affiliated with secret societies (these are political convicts).
- transported 4th class, 1st section (commonly known as doublage): released prisoners required to reside in French Guiana.
- transported, 4th class, 2nd section: released prisoners required to reside in French Guiana.

The first three categories could be authorized to work outside penitentiaries and camps for private individuals (family boys) or the administration. They could also receive a concession (land to develop) and, later, an urban concession (bakery or other work of collective interest).

- Assignees worked for private individuals, including prison officials, who received their wages (the family boys).

The sentence of relegation did not apply to any particular offense. It was enough to have been convicted several times to be relegated to French Guiana. Relegation was always for life. There were two types of relegués:

- collectives, living in a camp, fed and housed, obliged to work, but receiving only 2/3 of their salary,
- individuals who have their resources and only receive a quarterly call-up.

=== Military bagnes ===
The French army also set up colonial military prisons in North Africa, intended for strong-headed convicts and the military service of common-law convicts. The convicted soldiers were derisively called "joyeux" (happy). From 1889 (introduction of compulsory national service for convicts from civil courts), many of the soldiers from the special corps (from Biribi) made their way through the following bagne archipelago: correctional homes for minors (Petite-Roquette and other prisons for minors) and penal colonies (Colonie de Mettray and other colonies), colonial bagnes in North Africa, Bagne de Cayenne.

=== Bagnes for kids ===
The agricultural and maritime penal colonies for minors were veritable schools for crime. Following the 1810 penal code's separation of adults and children, some experiments were made on juvenile delinquents. Another agricultural colony experiment began in 1824. Young inmates from the Gaillon Central Prison were sent to work in the fields daily. A colony was set up there in 1847 due to the acquisition of the Douaires farm. This institution closed in 1925. In 1832, Count d'Argout proposed apprenticeships for these children, but this proposal was not accepted, and in 1836, a prison was set up for children: Petite-Roquette in Paris. In 1840, the first private agricultural colony was set up in Mettray, Indre-et-Loire. It was intended for juvenile delinquents who were to be employed in agricultural work. Following this, the law of August 5, 1850, generalized this type of establishment, and some fifty private agricultural colonies were set up throughout France. An agricultural penal colony was also established at Le Luc in the Gard department from 1856 to 1904.

On January 8, 1861, on Île du Levant, the Sainte-Anne agricultural penal colony was officially authorized to open. Its aim was to clear the island's land for cultivation. The first contingent arrived on March 23, 1861. When the Ajaccio children's prison closed, 65 convicts were transferred to Sainte-Anne on September 28, 1866. A revolt broke out on October 2, leading to the deaths of more than a dozen children, before order was restored on the island on October 4 by an army and gendarmerie detachment. A trial followed in January 1867. The colony was finally evacuated on November 23, 1878. A memorial has been erected on the site of the cemetery, consisting of a stone with plaques listing the names of the children who died there.

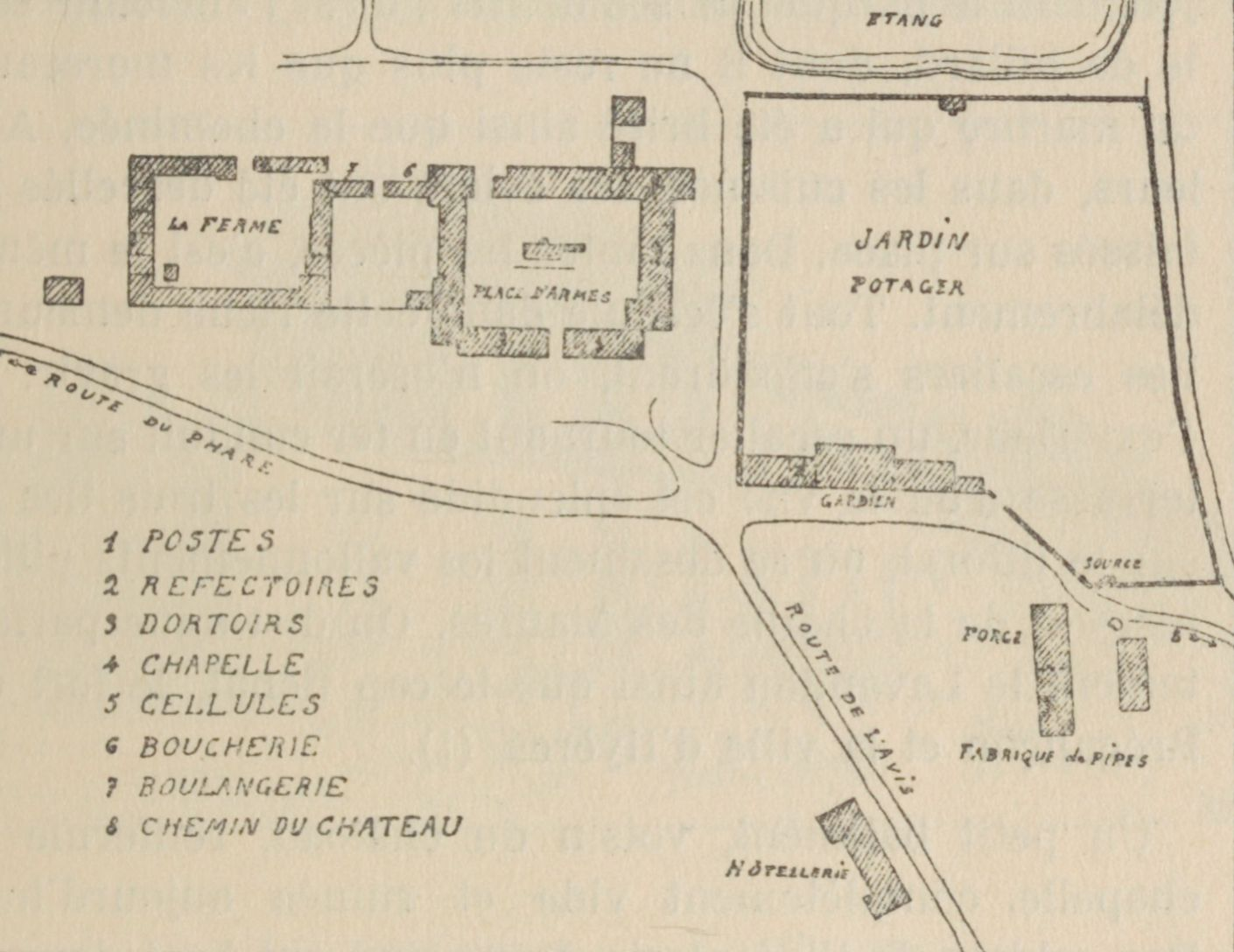
Plan of the Sainte-Anne penitentiary

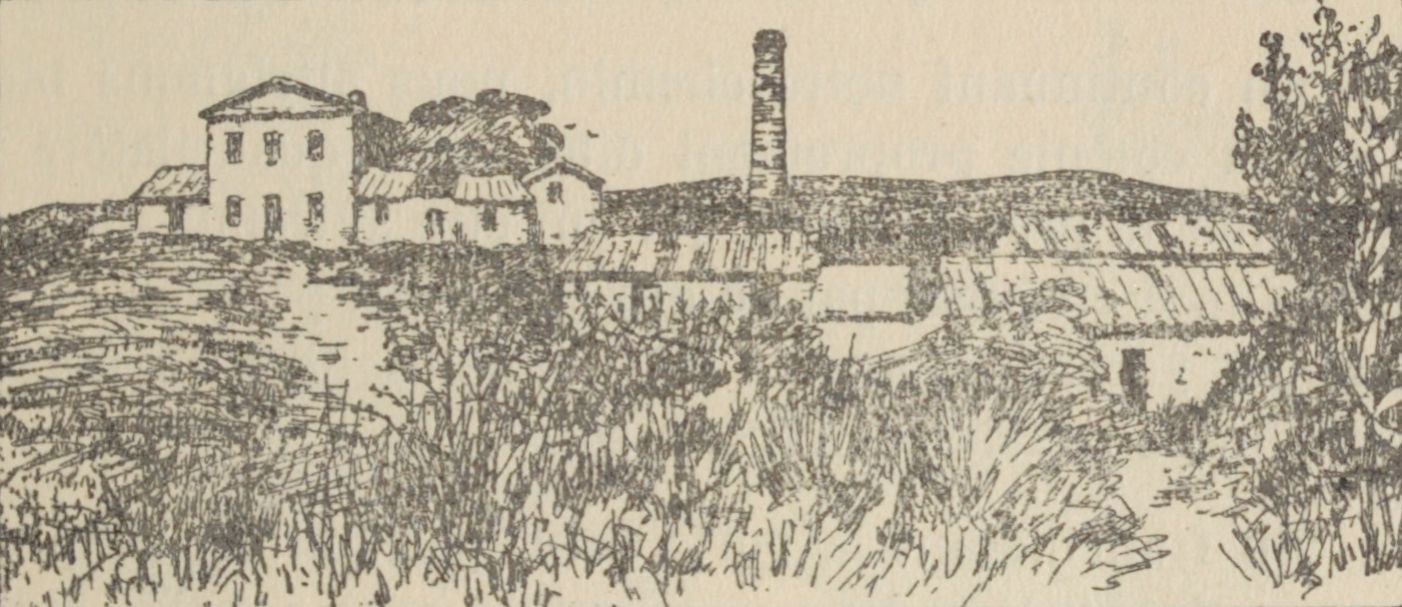
The pipe factory

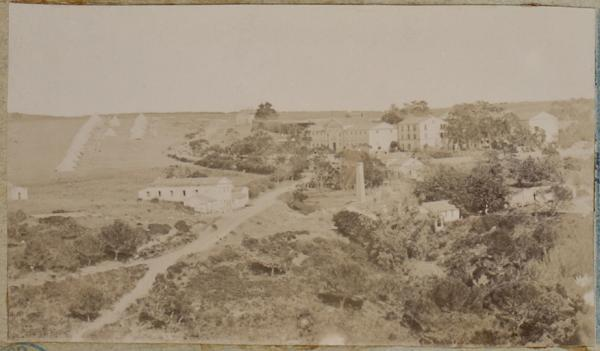
View of the children's penitentiary

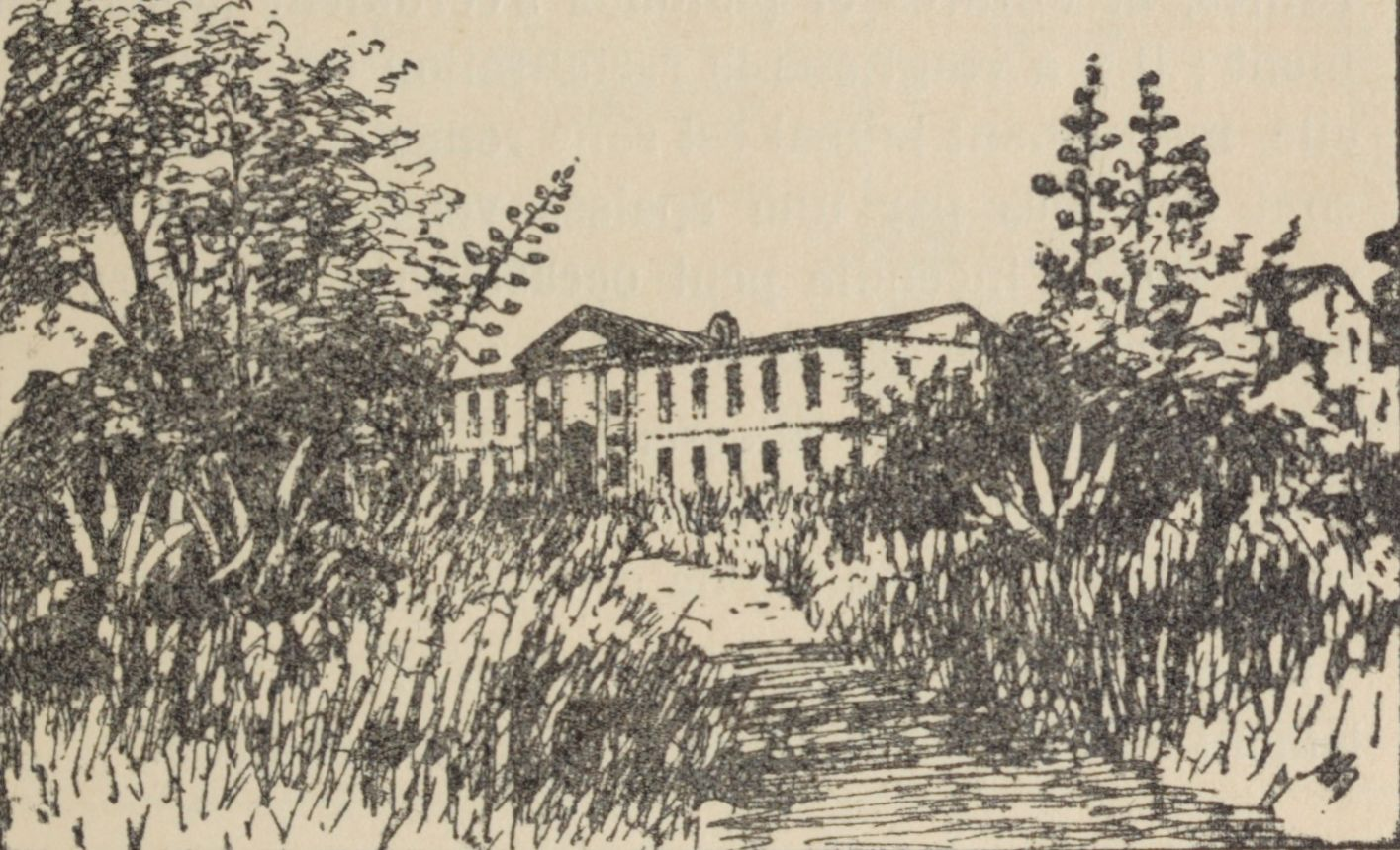
The dormitory

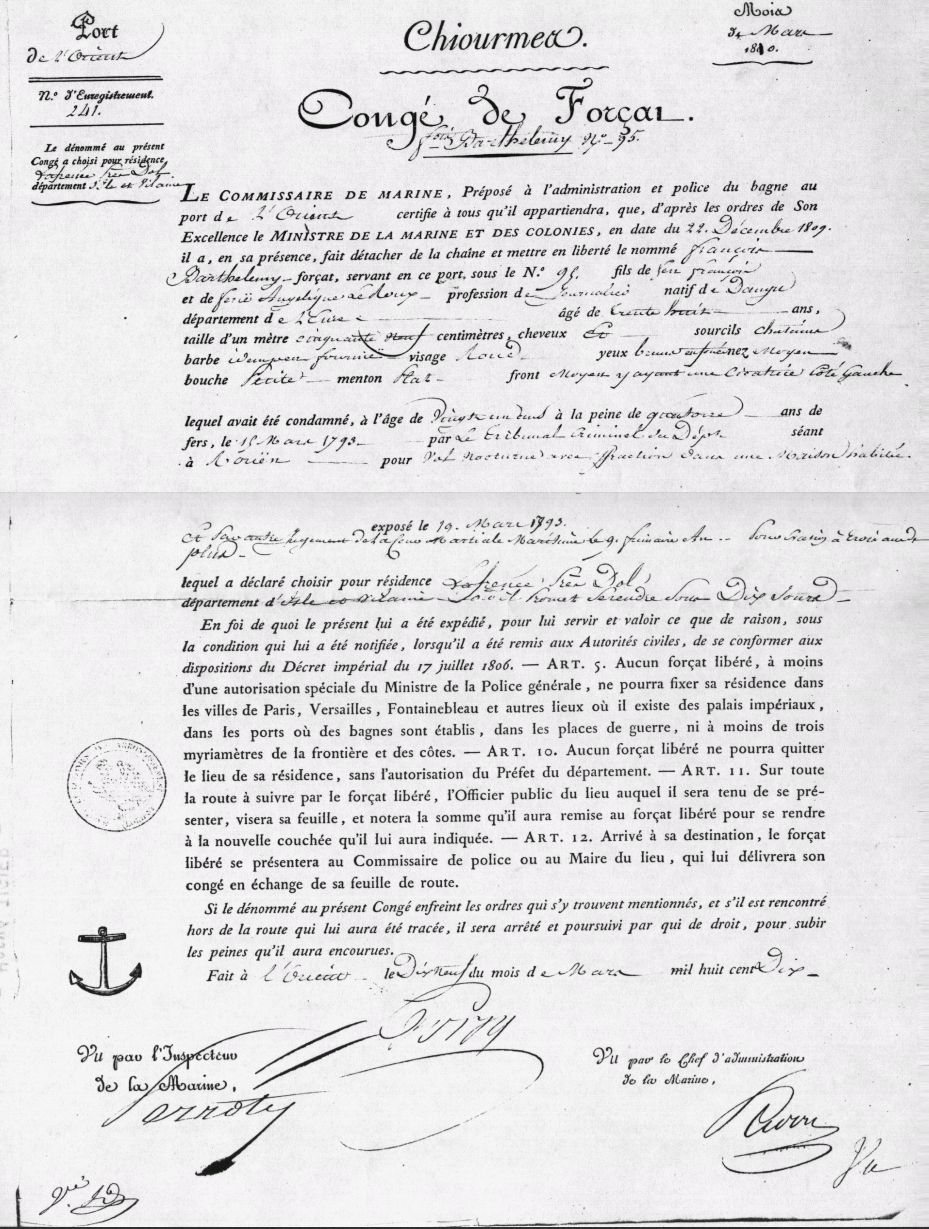
Congé issued to a convict released from Lorient in March 1810, authorizing him to go to his commune and report to the police commissioner in application of the imperial decree of July 17, 1806.

For insubordinate offenders from the agricultural colonies and for children under 16 sentenced to more than 2 years, the state set up a more repressive structure called "Colonie Correctionnelle". This penal institution for young inmates was set up in Corsica, in the Ajaccio region, in the Saint-Antoine valley, under the name of Colonie correctionnelle de Saint-Antoine. The establishment was a state-run detention center, a veritable children's penal colony. They were abolished, along with the agricultural colonies, with the 1945 Ordinance on delinquent children.

It was the 1934 revolt of the Belle-Île-en-Mer colony that led to the 1945 reform. This revolt inspired Jacques Prévert's poem La chasse à l'enfant. Jean Genet recounts his journey from the Mettray penal colony to the Fontevrault power station in Miracle de la Rose.

In October 2020, an archaeological excavation campaign on Reunion Island studied the island's agricultural penal colony. This former children's penitentiary on îlet à Guillaume was founded in 1864 and run by the Missionary Congregation of the Holy Spirit. Up to 4,000 children were confined here. Its closure was ordered in 1871, but only became effective in 1879. It has been listed as a Historic Monument since 2008.

=== Abolition ===
On the initiative of the Guyanese Gaston Monnerville, undersecretary for the Colonies, a decree-law of June 17, 1938, signed by French President Albert Lebrun abolished deportation, but detention in a penal colony remained in force until 1945. On August 1, 1953, the last convicts and their supervisors returned to France.

=== Location of French bagnes ===
==== Metropole ====
- Brest prison (Brest)
- Bagne de Lorient (Lorient)
- Bagne de Havre (Le Havre)
- Bagne de Cherbourg (Cherbourg)
- Bagne de Nice (Nice)
- Rochefort lagoon (Rochefort)
- Bagne of Toulon (Toulon)
- Dépôt de Condamnés de Saint-Martin-de-Ré (Saint-Martin-de-Ré)
- Bagne de Belle-Île-en-Mer (Belle-Île-en-Mer)

=== Overseas ===
Bagne (penal establishment) (Earth)

==== French Guiana ====
There is only one prison in French Guiana, but it is made up of several camps and penitentiaries.

- Cayenne penal colony (Cayenne)
- Bagne des Îles du Salut (dependent on Cayenne)
- Mana penal colony (or women's penal colony)
- Saint-Laurent-du-Maroni penal colony (Saint-Laurent-du-Maroni and Saint-Jean-du-Maroni)
- Camp Charvein (also known as "Camp de la Mort")
- Camp Crique Anguille (Montsinéry-Tonnegrande), also known as the "Bagne des Annamites", where Indochinese opponents of French colonization were held.
- Hattes camp
- Camp du kilomètre quarante
- Îlet Saint Louis camp
- Montagne d'Argent camp
- Saint Augustin camp
- Sainte Anne camp
- Sainte Marguerite camp
- Sainte Marie camp
- Saint Georges camp
- Camp de Saint Jean
- Camp de Saint Maurice
- Camp de Saint Philippe
- Saint Pierre camp
- Sparouine camp
- Camp des Malgaches
- Organabo camp
- Camp Godebert
- Camp La Forestière
- Camp Saut Tigre
- Nouveau Camp
- Îlet la Mère Penitentiary
- Kourou Penitentiary (Kourou)

==== New Caledonia ====
- New Caledonia penal colony
  - Nouméa penal colony (Nouméa)
  - Ile des Pins penal colony
  - Camp Brun

Communards were deported there.

==== Reunion Island ====
- Domaine de la Providence Penitentiary
- Islet à Guillaume penal colony for children

==== Madagascar ====
The Nosy Lava penal colony is on the island of Nosy Lava.

==== Indochina ====
There were 11 penitentiaries in this territory. Until 1938, some of the Indochinese convicts were transported to other French prison sites to make up for the shortage of manpower due to losses in living conditions.

- Poulo Condor prison
- Lao Bảo Prison, built in 1896 in Annam.
- Buôn Ma Thuột (Buon Ma Thuat), Buon Me Thuat or Ban Mê Thuột) prison, established in 1932 in Cochinchina.
- Son La Prison (vi), established in 1932 in Tonkin.
- Kon Tum prison.
- Phú Quốc prison.
- Phong Saly in Laos.

=== Italy ===
During the Napoleonic era, Italy boasted the bagnes of Genoa, Civitavecchia and La Spezia.

==== Location of military prisons ====
- Tataouine penal colony (Tataouine, Tunisia).
- Biribi penal colony (Algeria).
- Douera/Bône penal colony (Algeria).

=== Literature on the penal colony ===
The figure of the convict and the penitentiary were to inspire the literature of the 19th and 20th centuries. Victor Hugo, in Les Misérables, Jean Valjean and the chain gang to the Toulon penal colony.

- journalistic investigations by writer Jacques Dhur on the Biribi penal colony before 1914, and by Albert Londres on Cayenne and Biribi in 1923 and 1924
- internment of political opponents in a bagne: Communards in Nouméa, anarchists, and anti-militarists in Biribi, Dreyfus, on Devil's Island.
- song, in particular Aristide Bruand in A Biribi, Édith Piaf in Mon légionnaire.
- popular literature: Un civil chez les joyeux, Mac Orlan Le Bataillon de la mauvaise chance.
- memories of former convicts:
  - Papillon by Henri Charrière
  - René Belbenoit in Dry guillotine, Les compagnons de la belle
  - Georges Darien in Biribi, discipline militaire
  - Vidocq in his memoirs.
  - Jean Genet's memories of the Mettray penal colony and of prison in Le Miracle de la Rose.

=== Filmography ===
- Papillon by Franklin J. Schaffner, released in 1973, starring Steve McQueen and Dustin Hoffman.
- Les Ombres du Bagne, a documentary film shot in Saint Laurent.
- Les enfants du Bagne, a 2009 documentary directed by Nicolas Lévy-Beff.

== See also ==
- Penal colony
- Penal labour
- Penal transportation
- Vichy France
- Mettray Penal Colony
- Bagnio
- Devil's Island
- Galley
- Pierre Arnoul

== Bibliography ==
- Collectif sous la direction de Claude Liauzu (2007). Dictionnaire de la colonisation française. Larousse. ISBN 978-2035833433.
