= Jean-Baptiste Rolland (priest) =

1834–1903 French priest, teacher, educationalist

Personal details
- Born: 8 December 1834; Sivry, Verdun, France
- Died: 13 July 1903 (aged 68); Reefton, New Zealand
- Buried: Reefton Cemetery
- Occupation: Priest, Teacher.

Jean-Baptiste Rolland was a French-born missionary who was present at battles during Tītokowaru's War while acting as chaplain for soldiers. Rolland was present at the Battle at Te Ngutu o Te Manu where Major Von Tempsky was killed.

== Biography ==
Fr Rolland arrived in New Zealand in 1864 where he was stationed in Napier under Fr Jean Forrest. It was there he learnt English and Māori to help further his mission.

== Death ==
Rolland died on 13 July 1903 at Reefton where he had spent nineteen years as parish priest. He was buried at Reefton Cemetery with three volleys fired over his grave by Inangahua Rifle.
