= Louis de Lavau =

Louis de Lavau or Louis Irland de Lavau (died 4 February 1694) was a French clergyman, author of discourses and member of the Académie française.

Garde des livres of the cabinet du roi and a protégé of Colbert, he was elected to the Académie in 1679.
