= Saint-Sauveur-Gouvernet =

- Commune
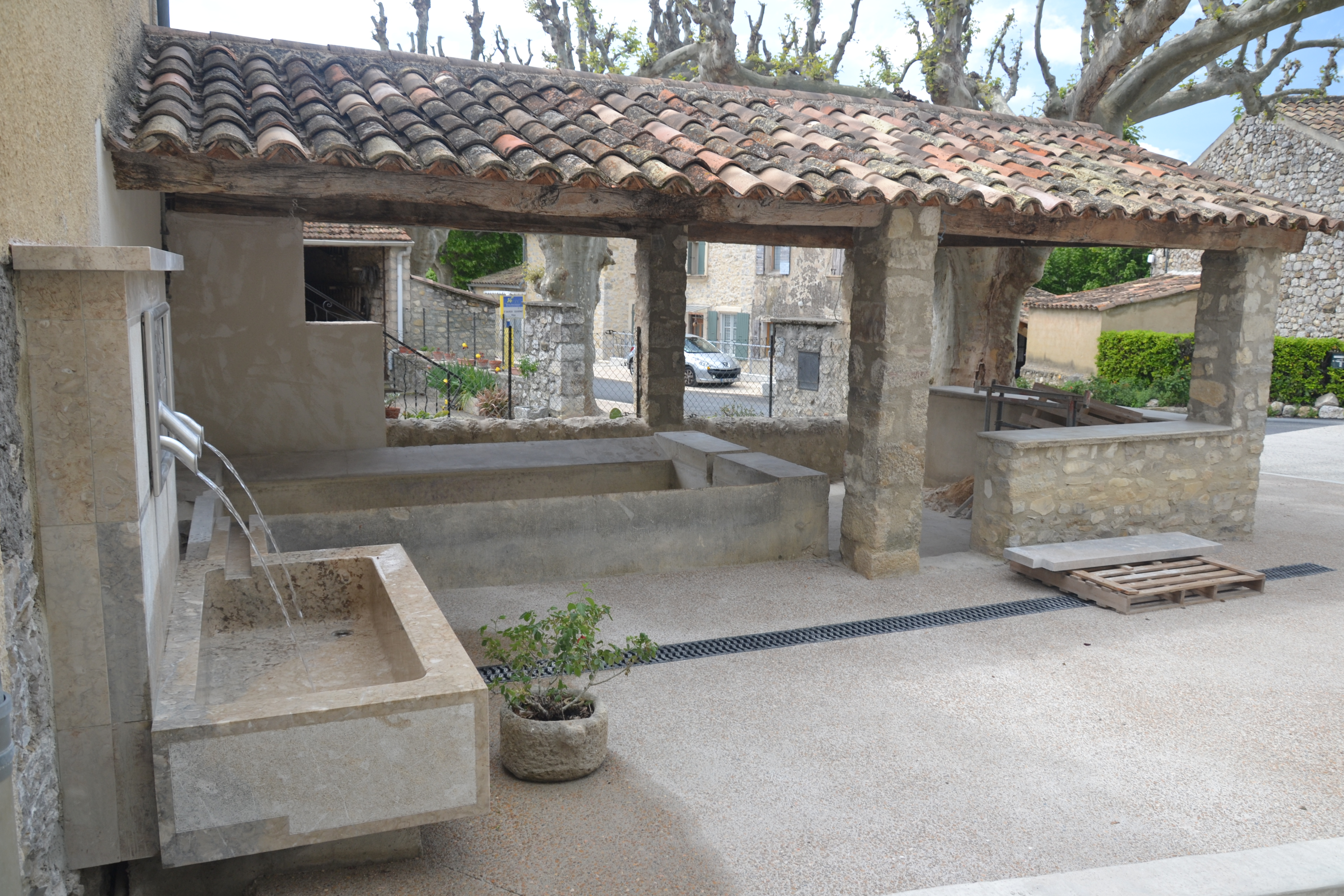
- The fountain and wash house in Saint-Sauveur-Gouvernet
- Location of Saint-Sauveur-Gouvernet
- Location within France Location within Auvergne-Rhône-Alpes
- Coordinates: 44°20′17″N 5°21′04″E
- Country: France
- Region: Auvergne-Rhône-Alpes
- Department: Drôme
- Arrondissement: Nyons
- Canton: Nyons et Baronnies

Government
  - Mayor (2020–2026): Christelle Ruysschaert
- Area^{1}: 19.32 km^{2} (7.46 sq mi)
- Elevation: 585 m (1,919 ft)
- Highest elevation: 1,392 m (4,567 ft)
- Lowest elevation: 449 m (1,473 ft)
- Population (2023): 188
  - Density: 9.73/km^{2} (25.2/sq mi)
- Time zone: UTC+01:00 (CET)
  - Summer (DST): UTC+02:00 (CEST)
- INSEE/Postal code: 26329 /26110
- ^{1} French Land Register data, which excludes lakes, ponds, glaciers > 1 km^{2} (0.386 sq mi or 247 acres) and river estuaries.

Saint-Sauveur-Gouvernet (French pronunciation: [sɛ̃ sovœʁ ɡuvɛʁnɛ]; Vivaro-Alpine: Sant Sauvador Governet) is a commune in the Drôme department in southeastern France.

== Population ==
Historical population
Year	Pop.	±% p.a.
1968	176	—
1975	164	−1.00%
1982	151	−1.17%
1990	161	+0.80%
1999	203	+2.61%
2007	205	+0.12%
2012	178	−2.79%
2017	182	+0.45%
2023	188	+0.54%
Source: INSEE

== See also ==
- Communes of the Drôme department
