= Anne-Marguerite Petit du Noyer =

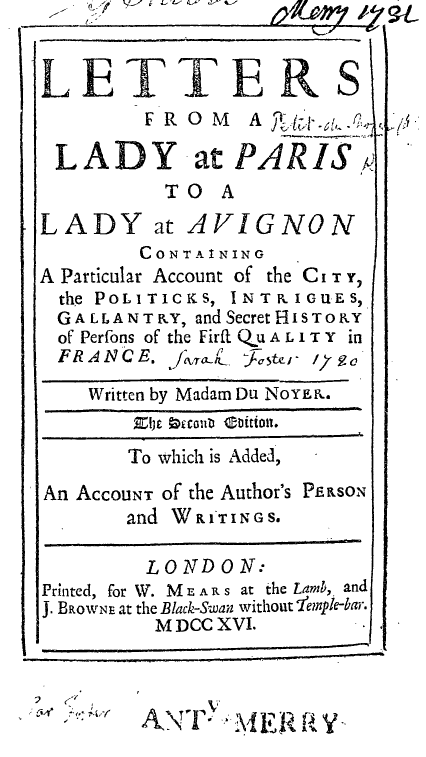
Du Noyer, Madame (Anne Marguerite Petit). Letters from a lady at Paris to a lady at Avignon containing a particular account of the city, the politicks, intrigues, gallantry, and secret history of persons of the first quality in France. The second edition. ... Vol. 1. London, 1716.

Anne-Marguerite du Noyer (Nîmes, Languedoc 2 June 1663 – Voorburg, May 1719) was an early 18th-century woman journalist. Her reports of the negotiations leading to the Peace of Utrecht were read all over Europe and admired for the distinction with which she reported on scandal and gossip. Born a Protestant, she converted to Catholicism in the years of the Huguenot persecution. In 1686 she married Guillaume du Noyer. In 1701 she converted back to Calvinism and had to leave France. She first moved to Geneva, then to The Hague. Among her famous visitors was Voltaire in 1713.

The following is an extract of the biography published with the Letters from a Lady at Paris to a Lady at Avignon, vol. 1 (London, W. Mears/ J. Browne, 1716), the attack on Richard Steele makes Delarivier Manley a likely candidate as author of these lines:

SHE is about 60 Years of age; and has in her time, made a considerable Figure in France, where her Husband was concern'd in managing the Publick Revenues, in consequence of which he is now under Prosecution before the Chamber of Justice.

What time this Lady left France, may be gather'd from her Writings. Religion was what she pretended for so doing, but her natural Inconstancy was the real Motive. She went to Holland with two Daughters and Money enough to have supported her honourably, if the desire of serving God in Spirit and in Truth, had been the sole Cause of her Flight: But her head continually running upon vast Undertakings, and filled with I know not what Ideas of Grandeur, she launch'd out into such profuse Expence, that instead of well settling her Daughters, when they were marriagable, she ruin'd their Reputation, and herself became a Prey to such as knew how to make Advantage of her weal side. Her eldest Daughter, who is called Eleonaora, a fair-complexion'd beautiful Woman, was very indifferently marry'd, and has since found means to return to her Father in Paris: The youngest, whom the Mother calls Pimpette, (instead of Olympia her true name) is a brown lively Woman and has marry'd a Footman, who pretended to be a German Count. She is still at the Hague with her Mother, as likewise a Daughter she has had by the Sham-Count, who is at this time a perfect Vagabond, and stroles about the Country for a livelyhood.

Madam Du Noyer, notwithstanding the ill Posture of her Affairs, and tho' she is convinc'd that all the World knows the truth of the Story, will have er Daughter to be call'd after her Husband's name, the Countess of Winterfeld, and whenever she speaks of that Daughter absent or present, she always intitles her Madam la Comtesse.

Madam Du Noyer, not knowing how otherwise to subsist, is reduced to write two Papers weekly, which she calls the Quintessence of News; this is worth 300 Florins Dutch, per Ann. which are paid duly by the Bookseller: And as she is very liberal of her Elogiums, this Paper gave her an Opportunity, during the Congress of Utrecht, to offer her Compliments to all the Ambassadors and their Ladies round; was a considerable advantage to her.

Of all her former Estate, she has nothing left but about 60l. per Ann. the rent of two Houses, the one in the Town, and the other in the Country. She, however, has shewed her self very little concerned at all these Crosses of Fortune: And indeed as she herself is the only Cause of them, she would be very much in the wrong to let them sower her Temper: She has, on the contrary, rather chose to laugh it off, and has given so witty, so ingenious an Account of her Adventures, that it is impossible to read them without being very much moved in her behalf. There are in her Miscellaneous Works some exquisite Things, and many pieces of History, which one is so well pleased with being informed of, that one cannot help to favouring her with our good Wishes for having collected them. Her Letters are writ in so easy and so natural a Style, that we pass on from one to t'other without being in the least tired with what we read. To conclude, when we look into her Memoirs,' she there seems to justifie herself so fully, that unless one knew her, ne cou'd not help pitying her Condition. This shews that she is a Lady of a superiour Genius, let her use it ill or well: Her Manners are easie, her Conversation agreeable and entertaining; and whatsoever Subject she talks upon she always manages it with abundance of Justness. Her Person is not answerable to her Wit; she has formerly been tolerably handsome, and tho' low of Stature, and but indifferently shaped, had nothing disagreeable in her; but at present she is almost frightfully Ugly, being grown prodigiously Fat, and extremely Swarthy: However the Writings she has obliged the World with, ought to make amends for any thing that is amiss either in her Person or in her Conduct.

Her works are appreciated in the same context:

[...] they are full of those peculiar Beauties which reign in the best of the Fair Sex. The Subjects they turn upon, are the Loves and Intrigues of Persons of the first Quality in France, and these not derived from common Fame, and the general magazine of Scandal, but from the Knowledge of one, whose Interests and Pleasures lay mixt with theirs, and who receiving the Facts from the Fountain-Head, gave them only the Advantage of a good Dress, and conveyed them in an agreeable manner to the World.

If Secrets of this Nature must come abroad, (and somehow or other they will) it is happy when they fall into the Hands of a witty and gallant Writer. One Degree less of good Sense, and good Nature, makes a vast difference in the Relater of a Story; and that which would please us very much if well told, disgusts us at the first view of Rigour or Partiality. For instance, we have in these Letters a very particular Account of Madam de Maintenon's Management of the late King of France; and yet there is nothing that can give the least Offence in so nice a Subject. The materials scatterd up and down in these Letters furnished Sir Richard Steele with two Guardians upon the Life and Conduct of that famous Lady. But we may say, without offence to that Gentleman, that the Stories are much more natural and agreeable in the manner which this Lady has related them, than in his Papers.

== Works ==
- Lettres historiques et galantes de deux dames de condition, dont l'une était à Paris et l'autre en province, par Mme de C*** [A.-M. Du Noyer] Cologne [The Hague]: P. Marteau, 1713.

== Literature ==
- [Delarivier Manley?], "An Account of Madam DuNoyer's Person and Writings", in Anne Marguerite Petit Du Noyer, Letters from a Lady at Paris to a Lady at Avignon, vol 1, 2nd edition (London, W. Mears/ J. Browne, 1716).
- Zacharias Conrad von Uffenbach, Merckwürdige Reisen, Bd. 3 (published after the authors death in Ulm, 1754), p. 367-368.
- Regine Reynolds-Cornell: Fiction and reality in the Mémoires of the notorious Anne-Marguerite Petit DuNoyer (Tübingen: Narr 1999). ISBN 3-8233-5527-9
- Olaf Simons: Marteaus Europa oder Der Roman, bevor er Literatur wurde (Amsterdam/ Atlanta: Rodopi, 2001), p. 642. ISBN 90-420-1226-9
