= Holy Ghost (disambiguation) =

Holy Ghost is the third divine person of the Trinity in mainstream Christian theology.

Holy Ghost may also refer to:

== Religion ==
- Holy Spirit, a term found in English translations of the Bible, but understood differently among the Abrahamic religions
  - Holy Spirit (Islam), referring to the angel Gabriel in the Quran
  - Holy Spirit (Judaism), the Spirit of YHWH in the Hebrew Bible (Tanakh) and Jewish writings

=== Religious orders ===
- Order of the Holy Ghost, a Roman Catholic religious order, founded by Guy de Montpellier in Provence for the care of the sick by groups of lay people
- Congregation of the Holy Ghost (disambiguation)

==== Other eponymous institutions ====
- Church of the Holy Ghost (disambiguation)
- Hospital of the Holy Ghost, Aalborg, a former establishment of the Order of the Holy Ghost in Aalborg, Denmark
- House of the Holy Ghost, Copenhagen, historic building exhibition space by the adjacent Church of the Holy Ghost in Copenhagen, Denmark
- Holy Ghost High School in Opelousas, Louisiana
- Holy Ghost Seminary, Ypsilanti, Michigan

== Music and films ==
- Holy Ghost (2014 film), a 2014 documentary film on the Holy Spirit's presence in the world
- Holy Ghost (2025 film), an upcoming Indian American horror mystery film
- Holy Ghost!, American electronic music group

=== Albums ===
- Holy Ghost: Rare & Unissued Recordings (1962–70) by Albert Ayler
- Holy Ghost! (album), 2011 album by Holy Ghost!
- Holy Ghost (Marc Ford album), 2014
- Holy Ghost (Modern Baseball album), 2016
- Holy Ghost, a 2013 album by Mariposa

=== Songs ===
- "Holy Ghost", 1978 song by Bar-Kays
- "Holy Ghost", 2011 song by White Lies from the album Ritual
- "Holy Ghost", 2014 song by ASAP Rocky from the album At. Long. Last. ASAP
- "Holy Ghost", 2016 song by Violent Femmes from the album We Can Do Anything
- "Holy Ghost", a 2022 song by Future from the album I Never Liked You

== Ships ==
- English carrack Holigost, a carrack in service with the English Navigation

== See also ==
- Holy Spirit (disambiguation)
