= Holy Spirit (disambiguation) =

Holy Spirit is an aspect of God in Abrahamic religions.

Holy Spirit may also refer to:

== Religion ==
- Holy Spirit in Judaism, Ruach HaKodesh, the Spirit of YHWH in the Hebrew Bible (Tanakh) and Jewish writings
- Holy Spirit in Christianity, person of the Trinity; interpreted differently by Non-Trinitarians
  - Holy Spirit (Christian denominational variations), the various Christian doctrines of the Holy Spirit
- Holy Spirit in Islam, Ruh al-Quds, in the Quran, interpreted by some people as the angel Gabriel

=== Religious orders ===
- Holy Spirit Adoration Sisters, Roman Catholic religious institute of cloistered nuns
- Daughters of the Holy Spirit, Roman Catholic religious institute of women
- Missionaries of the Holy Spirit, Catholic religious institute founded in Mexico City in 1914 by Félix de Jesús Rougier

=== Places of worship ===
- Holy Spirit Cathedral (disambiguation)
- Church of the Holy Spirit (disambiguation)
- Monastery of the Holy Spirit near Conyers, Georgia, USA

=== Schools ===
- Holy Spirit College, Atlanta, Georgia, USA
- Holy Spirit School (disambiguation)

=== Other religious institutions ===
- Bank of the Holy Spirit, Italian bank
- Holy Spirit Hospital (disambiguation)

== Other uses ==
- Order of the Holy Spirit, French chivalric order
- Holy Spirit Movement, Ugandan rebel group

== See also ==
- Espírito Santo (disambiguation) (Portuguese)
- Espiritu Santo (disambiguation) (Spanish)
- Holy Ghost (disambiguation)
- Spirit of God (disambiguation)
- Sancti Spiritus (disambiguation) (Latin)
- Spirito Santo (disambiguation) (Italian)
