= Giovanni Battista de Luca =

Catholic cardinal and jurist

His Eminence Giovanni Battista De Luca
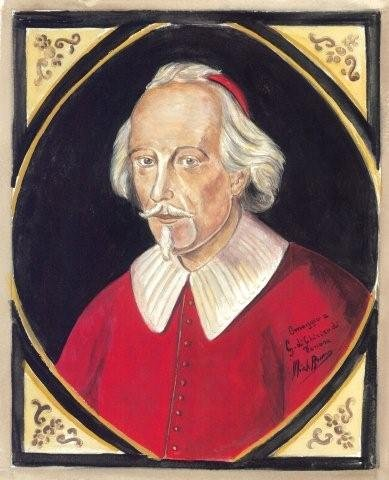
- Giovanni Battista De Luca
- Diocese: Diocese of Rome
- Appointed: 1 September 1681
- Term ended: 5 February 1683

Orders
- Created cardinal: 9 April 1657 by Pope Innocent XI
- Rank: Cardinal-Priest of San Girolamo dei Croati

Personal details
- Born: 1614 Venosa, Kingdom of Naples
- Died: 5 February 1683 (aged 68–69) Rome, Papal States
- Buried: Santo Spirito dei Napoletani
- Denomination: Roman Catholic
- Parents: Antonio de Luca; Angela Giacullo
- Education: University of Naples Federico II (J.D., 1635)

Giovanni Battista de Luca (1614 – 5 February 1683) was an Italian jurist and Cardinal of the Roman Catholic Church. He is considered one of the most important and influential jurists of 17th-century Europe.

== Biography ==
De Luca was born at Venosa, Basilicata, in 1614 of humble parentage. In 1631, he enrolled at the University of Naples, the liveliest centre for legal studies in Italy at the time, where he studied law under Ferdinando Arias de Mesa, an eminent jurist of the School of Salamanca. He received his degree in law in 1635.

After graduation, he practiced law as an advocate in Naples for five years. This was a decisive experience in his professional formation, allowing him not only to gain a profound knowledge of the current practice of the courts but also to develop a critical vision of the system of jus commune. An attack of pulmonary tuberculosis caused him to return to his native place, where he took up the bishop's vicariate.

In 1645, De Luca went to Rome, where he soon won a high reputation for his legal ability and became one of Italy's pre-eminent attorneys. In 1658, the king of Spain named de Luca his lawyer in order to defend his interests before the Roman Curia. He actively participated in the cultural life of Rome and attended the meetings of several learned societies, including the Royal Academy founded by Queen Christina of Sweden in 1680. He befriended the poet Tommaso Stigliani, who intended dedicating to him his unfinished treatise Sulla nobiltà.

The support and protection of Nicola Herrera, the apostolic nuncio in Naples, of the Neapolitan cardinals Pier Luigi Carafa and Innico Caracciolo, and above all that of Niccolò Ludovisi, prince of Venosa, permitted De Luca to enter quickly into the most important circles at the papal court. As a close collaborator of the reform-minded pope Innocent XI, who acceded to the Holy See in 1676, he exerted influence over the organisation of the Roman Curia, but stirred up much enmity and jealousy among the conservative leaders of the Church, notably Innocent's secretary Agostino Favoriti.

This caused his influence to wane over time. At an advanced age, he became a priest and was made first referendary Utriusque Signaturae, then auditor of the Sacred Palace by Innocent, who finally in 1681 raised De Luca to the cardinalate.

He died at Rome, on 5 February 1683. He was buried in the Church of Santo Spirito dei Napoletani.

== Works ==
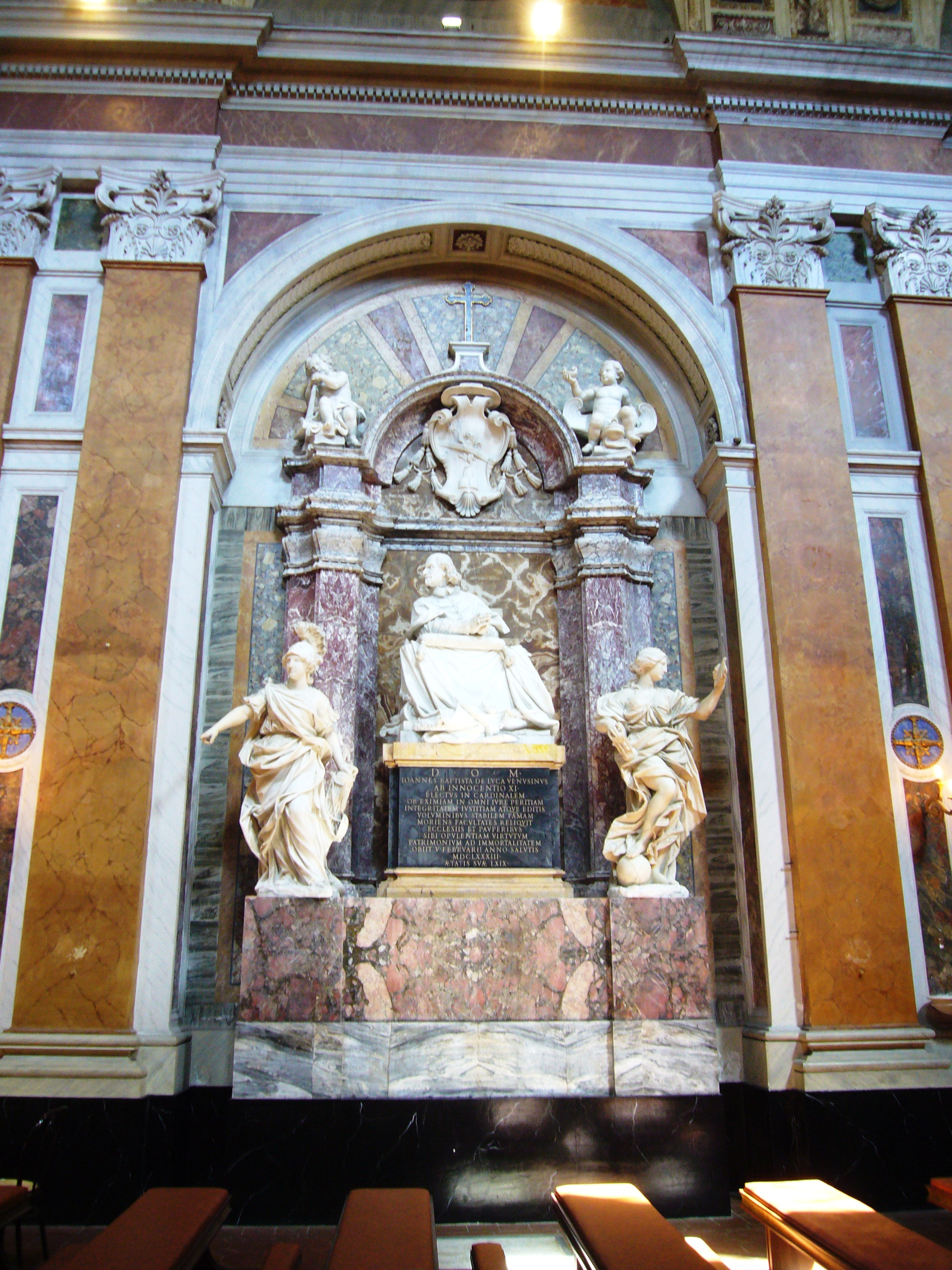
Monument to Giovanni Battista de Luca in Rome, Santo Spirito dei Napoletani, by Domenico Guidi, 1683.

De Luca's writings, which are eminently practical in character, are most important for proper understanding of the jurisprudence of the Roman Curia and especially of the Rota Romana in his time. They include his "Conflictus legis et rationis" (Rome, 1677), "Relatio Curiae Romanae" (Cologne, 1683), "Sacrae Rotae decisiones" (Lyons, 1700). His "Annotationes practicae ad Sacrum Concilium Tridentinum" (Cologne, 1684), a legal commentary on the decrees of the Council of Trent, became a prime authority and was reissued several times.

His complete works were published under the title "Theatrum veritatis et justitiae (Theater of truth and justice, 19 volumes, 1669–77; 12 volumes, Cologne, 1689–99); a comprehensive legal encyclopedia that became one of the most significant authorities of the late jus commune and was reprinted regularly up until the middle of the 18th century.

De Luca also advocated the use of the Italian language in scientific publications and authored numerous works in Italian providing a comprehensive picture of the legal and institutional framework of his time. In 1673 he published in Rome Il dottor volgare (The popular lawyer), a vast synthesis of all contemporary legal knowledge – the first written in Italian. In the introduction to this work the author argues in favor of the use of the common language in place of Latin in order to render law familiar outside the legal sphere, for the benefit of a nonprofessional readership. He reasserted his theses in two brief but important works: Dello stile legale (On the style of law, 1674) and Difesa della lingua italiana (Defense of the Italian language, 1675).

== Economic works and theories ==
Best known as a jurist, de Luca wrote also on economic and fiscal questions in his two treatises: Theatrum veritatis et justitiae, Rome, 1669 and Il Principe cristiano pratico, Rome, 1679.

As an economist, de Luca belongs to the mercantilist school. International trade, in his opinion, is only a means of getting money from foreigners; raw materials are to be allowed to be imported, but their export is to be prohibited, because only when they are transformed by national industry will they procure a favorable balance of trade. Money is not to be falsified by the prince, but its export, and also the export of bullion, is to be prohibited, except for the acquisition of those wares which cannot he produced by the country. Famines are to be guarded against by a subtle system of regulation.

In normal times, agriculture is to be aided and importation of foreign produce to be prohibited. In case of famine, all are to sell their product to a public office (a sort of store for corn under government administration), which is not to pay for it immediately. In his work de Luca discusses also questions of public finance. First of all he shows himself aware of the historical relativity of institutions, so that when he discusses the question, whether direct taxes are to be imposed with the consent of parliaments, he insists upon this being decided differently in different nations, and with due regard to the different customs and political maturity of the various nations.

Taxes in general, he considers, ought to be levied in such a manner that people pay them insensibly, that tax collectors cannot exact more than the government receives, that all citizens, without privilege and exemption, come to bear a proportionately equal burden, and that no tax be imposed when not absolutely necessary for the existence of the state. De Luca distinguishes correctly the revenue from the private property of the sovereign, and makes a most minute examination of all the different descriptions of crown rights. He defends the state monopoly of salt and tobacco.

== List of works ==
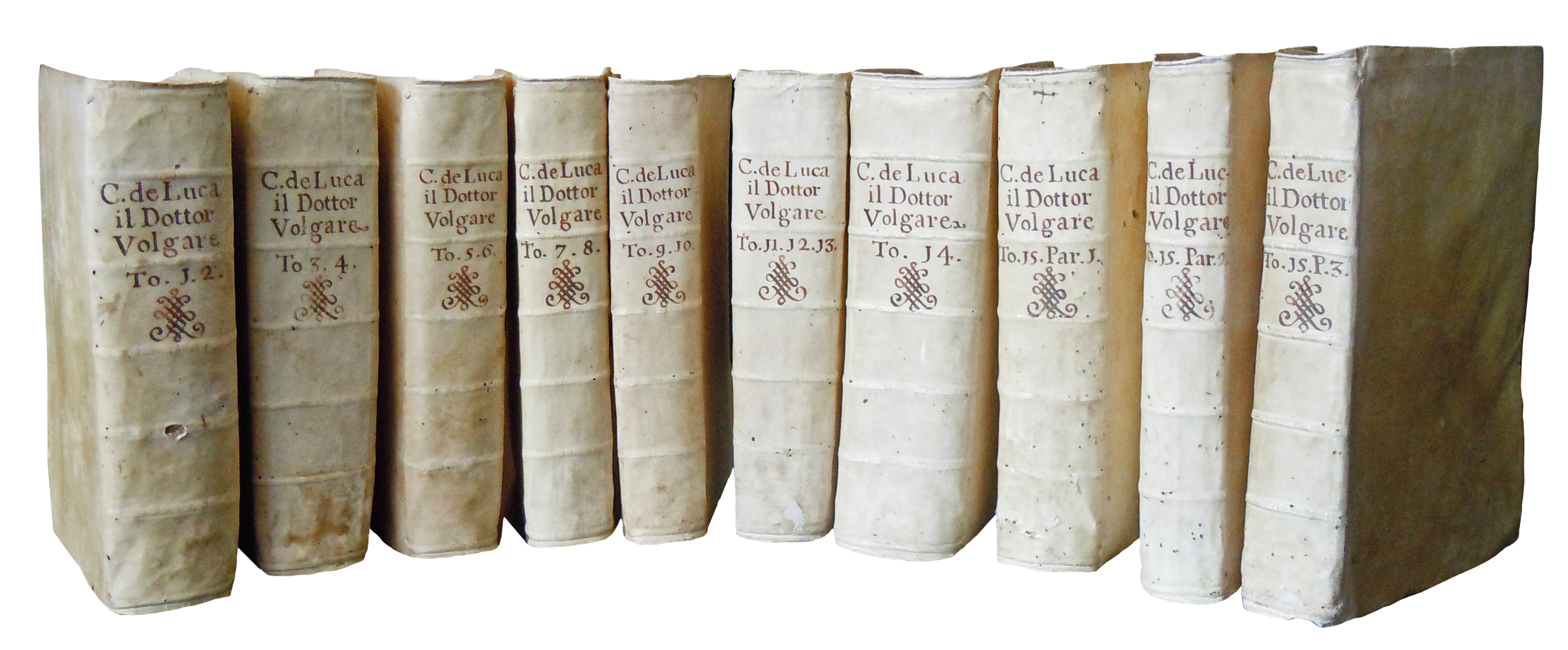
Il dottor volgare, Rome, 1673.

- Il Dottor volgare (in Italian). Rome: stamperia di Giuseppe Corvo. 1673.
- Dello stile legale (in Italian). Rome: per Giacomo Dragondelli. 1674.
- Difesa della lingua italiana (in Italian). Rome. 1675.
- Il cavaliere e la dama (in Italian). Rome: per il Dragondelli. 1675.
- Il vescovo pratico (in Italian). Rome: per gli Eredi del Corbelletti. 1675.
- Il religioso pratico (in Italian). Rome: nella stamperia della Reuerenda Camera Apostolica. 1679.
- Il Principe cristiano pratico (in Italian). Rome: nella stamperia della Reuerenda Camera Apostolica. 1680.
- Il cardinale della S.R. Chiesa pratico (in Italian). Rome: nella stamperia della Reuerenda Camera Apostolica. 1680.
- De officiis venalibus vacabilibus Romanae Curiae (in Latin). Rome: Nicolò Angelo Tinassi per la Stamperia Camerale. 1682.
- Relatio Curiae Romanae (in Latin). Cologne: sumptibus Arnoldi Metternich. 1683.
- Adnotationes practicae ad S. Concilium Tridentinum (in Latin). Cologne. 1684.
- Theatrum veritatis et justitiae (19 sv., 1669–77; 12 sv.), Colonia, 1689–99.
  - Theatrum veritatis et justitiae (in Latin). Venice: Paolo Baglioni. 1706.
  - Sacrae Rotae decisiones (in Latin). Lyon. 1700.
- Discorso dello stile legale cioè Del mondo co'l quale i professori debbano trattare in scritto [et] in voce delle materie giuridiche, giudiziali [et] estragiudiziali. Lyons: Cramer and Perachon. 1697.
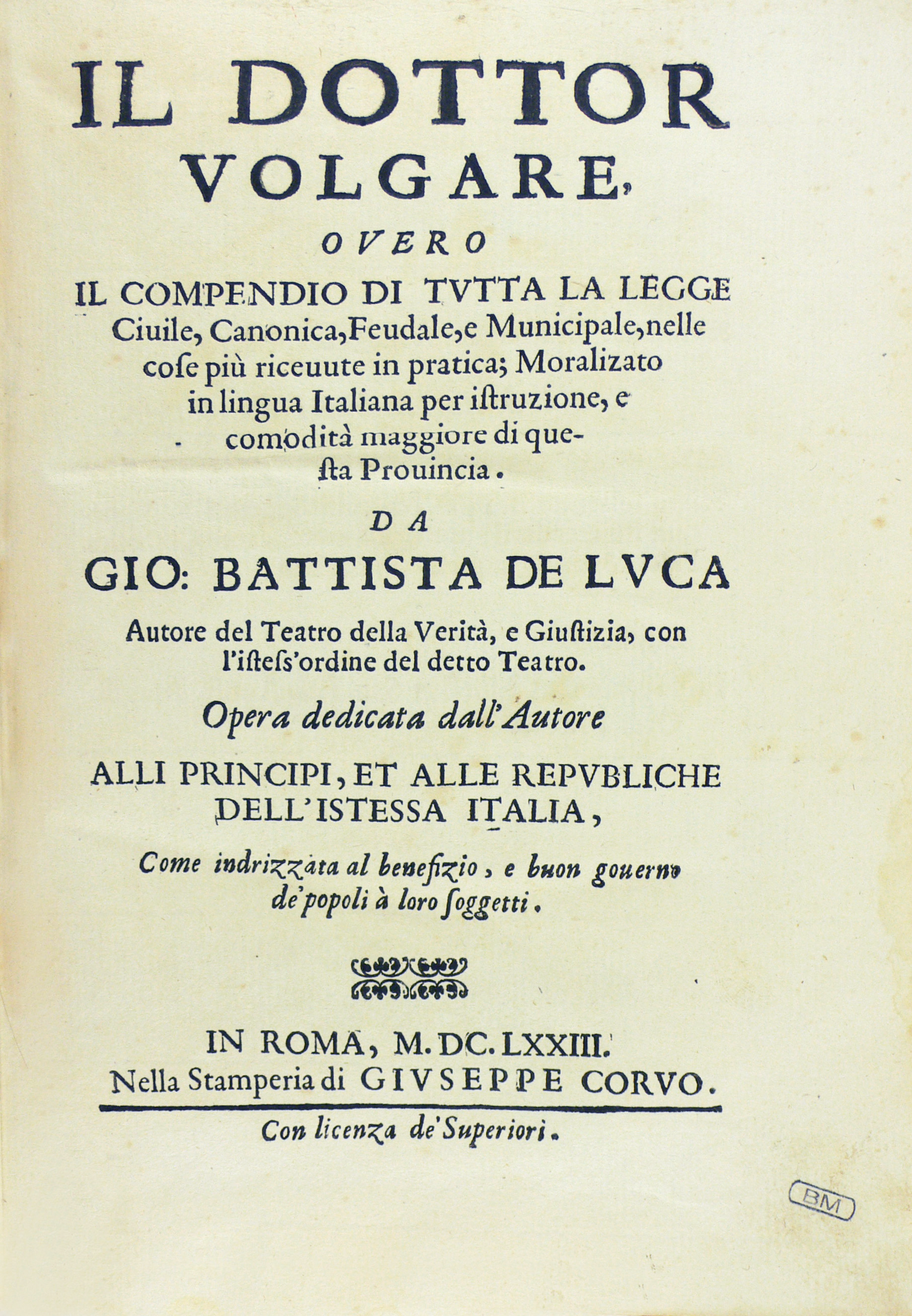
Il dottor volgare, 1673

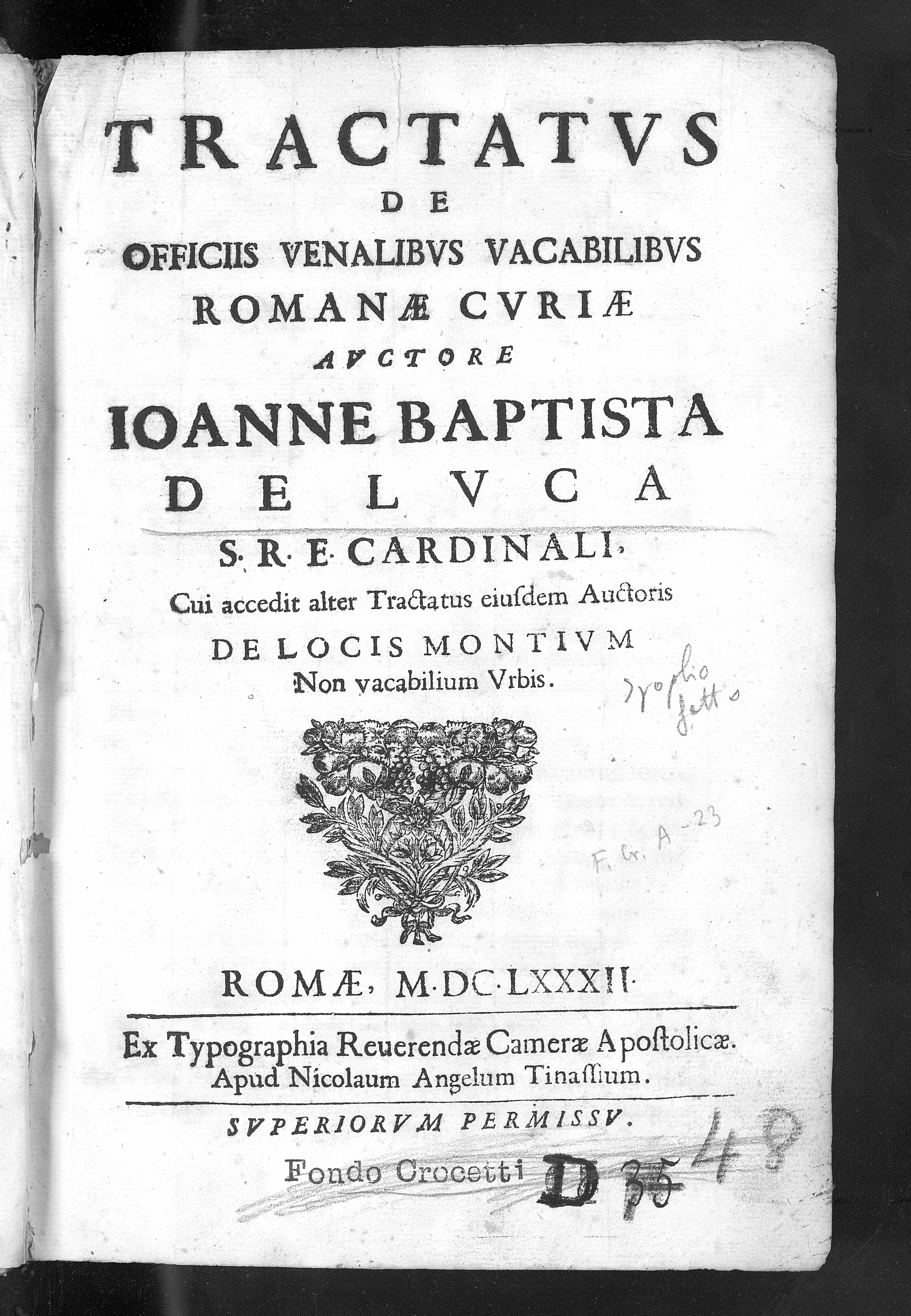
De officiis venalibus vacabilibus Romanae Curiae, 1682

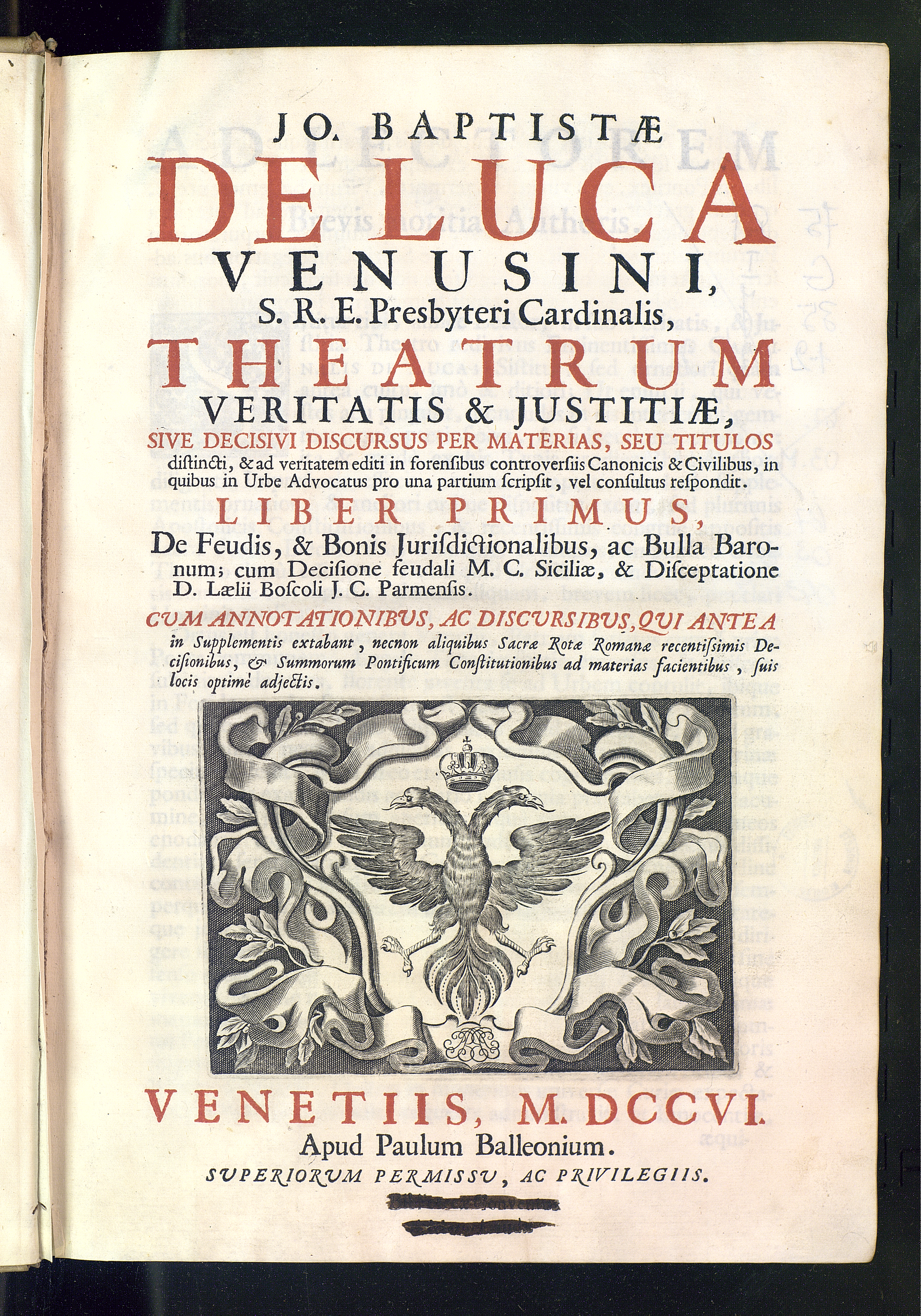
Theatrum veritatis et justitiae, 1706

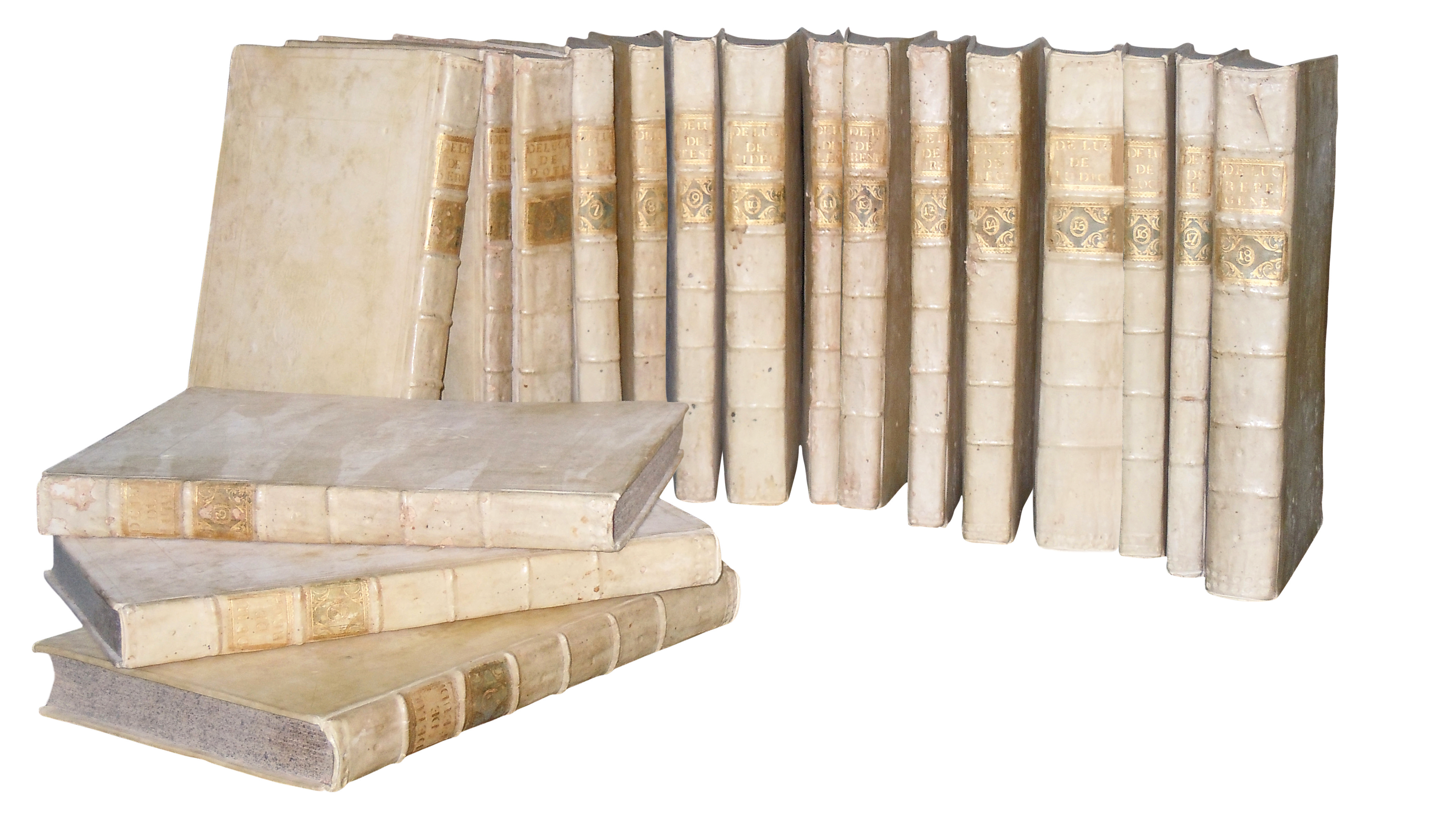
Theatrum veritatis, et justitiae, 1669–77

== Bibliography ==
- Toppi, Niccolò (1678). Biblioteca Napoletana et apparato agli huomini illustri in lettere di Napoli. Naples: Antonio Bulifon. pp. 133–134.
- Pantaleoni, Maffeo (1894). "de Luca, Giovanni Battista". Dictionary of Political Economy. Vol. 1. London: Macmillan and Company. p. 539. This article incorporates text from this source, which is in the public domain.
- This article incorporates text from a publication now in the public domain: Herbermann, Charles, ed. (1913). "Giovanni Battista de Luca". Catholic Encyclopedia. New York: Robert Appleton Company.
- Mazzacane, Aldo (1990). "DE LUCA, Giovanni Battista". Dizionario Biografico degli Italiani (in Italian). Vol. 38: Della Volpe–Denza. Rome: Institute of the Italian Encyclopaedia. ISBN 978-88-12-00032-6.
- Lauro, Agostino (1991). Il cardinale Giovan Battista de Luca: diritto e riforme nello Stato della Chiesa (1676-1683). Naples: Jovene.
- Mazzacane, Aldo (2001). "de Luca, Giovanni Battista". In Michael Stolleis (ed.). Juristen: ein biographisches Lexikon; von der Antike bis zum 20. Jahrhundert (in German) (2nd ed.). München: Beck. p. 164. ISBN 3-406-45957-9.
- Mazzacane, A.; Jackson, J. (2009). "De Luca, Giovanni Battista". The Oxford International Encyclopedia of Legal History. Oxford University Press.
- Dani, Alessandro (2011). "La figura e le prerogative del giudice nell'opera di Giovanni Battista De Luca". Giustizia dello Stato pontificio in età moderna. Rome: Viella. pp. 125–148. doi:10.23744/3973. ISBN 9788883346750.
- "Cardinal Giovanni Battista De Luca: Nepotism in the Seventeenth-century Catholic Church and De Luca's Efforts to Prohibit the Practice". August 2012. doi:10.12794/metadc149577.
- Dani, Alessandro (2012). "De Luca, Giovanni Battista". Il Contributo italiano alla storia del Pensiero: Diritto. Istituto dell'Enciclopedia Italiana.
- Mazzacane, Aldo (2012). "Argomentare a Roma nel secolo XVII: Lo 'Stile legale' di Giambattista De Luca". Ars Persuasionis: Entre Doute et Certitude. Duncker & Humblot: 43–56. ISBN 978-3428137916.
- Alla riscoperta del Cardinale Giovanni Battista De Luca: Atti del Convegno Nazionale di Studio (Venosa, 5-6 dicembre 2014) (in Italian). Osanna Edizioni. 2016. ISBN 9788881674954.
- Mazzacane, Aldo (2016). "Theatrum Veritatis et Iustitiae". The Formation and Transmission of Western Legal Culture: 150 Books That Made the Law in the Age of Printing. Springer: 214–216. ISBN 9783319455679.
- Padoa-Schioppa, Antonio (2017). A History of Law in Europe. From the Early Middle Ages to the Twentieth Century. Cambridge University Press. pp. 291–293. ISBN 9781107180697.
