= Frauenburg =

Frauenburg may refer to the following places:

- Frauenburg (castle), in Styria, Austria
- the German name of Frombork, Poland
- the German exonym for the city of Saldus, Latvia
- Unzmarkt-Frauenburg, a municipality in Austria
- several castles and abbeys in Germany and Austria
