= Espírito Santo (disambiguation) =

Espírito Santo is a state in southeastern Brazil.

Espírito Santo (Portuguese, 'Holy Spirit') may also refer to:

== Places ==
=== Brazil ===
- Espírito Santo, Rio Grande do Norte
- Espírito Santo, Rio Grande do Sul
- Espírito Santo do Pinhal, São Paulo state
- Espírito Santo do Turvo, São Paulo state

=== Portugal ===
- Espírito Santo, a parish of Mértola
- Espírito Santo, a parish of Nisa
- Igreja do Espírito Santo (Évora), a church in Portugal

=== Comoros ===
- Espírito Santo, the name given in 1503 to Mayotte

== People ==
- Guilherme Espírito Santo (1919–2012), Portuguese footballer and athlete
- Alfredo Espírito Santo (born 1938), Angolan-Portuguese footballer
- Nuno Espírito Santo (born 1974), Portuguese footballer and manager
- Ricardo Espírito Santo (1900–1955), Portuguese banker
- Manuel Espírito Santo (born 2003), Portuguese racing driver

== Other uses ==
- Banco Espírito Santo, a Portuguese bank
- Espírito Santo Financial Group, a Portuguese holding company
- University of Évora, formerly Universidade do Espírito Santo, Portugal

== See also ==
- Espiritu Santo (disambiguation)
- Holy Spirit (disambiguation)
- Sancti Spiritus (disambiguation)
- Santo Spirito (disambiguation)
- Santo Espírito, Vila do Porto, Azores
