= Holy Spirit Hospital =

Holy Spirit Hospital may refer to:

- Hospital of the Holy Spirit, Rome, Italy
- Holy Spirit Hospital, Berlin, Germany
- Holy Spirit Hospital, Makeni, Sierra Leone
- Holy Spirit Hospital, Mumbai, India
- Penn State Holy Spirit, Camp Hill, Pennsylvania, United States
- Santo Spirito Hospital, Rabat, Malta
- Hospital of the Holy Spirit, Warsaw, Poland
- Holy Spirit Hospital, Nuremberg, Germany
- Holy Spirit Hospital, Frombork, Poland
