= Sancti Spiritus (disambiguation) =

Sancti Spiritus (Latin genitive, 'of the holy spirit') or Sancti Spiritu may refer to:

== Places ==
- Sancti-Spíritus, Badajoz, Spain
- Sancti-Spíritus, Salamanca, Spain
- Sancti Spíritus, Cuba
  - Sancti Spíritus Province
  - Sancti Spíritus Airport
- Sancti Spiritu (Argentina), a 1527 fortification

== Other uses ==
- Sancti Spiritus (cigar)
- FC Sancti Spíritus, a Cuban football club, based in Sancti Spíritus
- Sancti Spíritus (baseball), Cuba

== See also ==
- Espírito Santo (disambiguation)
- Espiritu Santo (disambiguation)
- Holy Spirit (disambiguation)
- Santo Spirito (disambiguation)
- Spiritus Sanctus Academies
- Spiritus sancti gratia
