= Holy Spirit School =

Holy Spirit School may refer to:

== U.S. ==
- Holy Spirit Catholic Regional School in Tuscaloosa, Alabama
- Holy Spirit Catholic School (San Jose, California)
- Holy Spirit Elementary School (Kentucky) in Louisville, Kentucky
- Holy Spirit High School (New Jersey) in Absecon, New Jersey
- Holy Spirit Preparatory School in Atlanta, Georgia

== Elsewhere ==
- Holy Spirit High School (Newfoundland) in Conception Bay South, Newfoundland and Labrador, Canada
- Holy Spirit School of Tagbilaran in Tagbilaran City, Bohol, Philippines

== See also ==
- Holy Spirit (disambiguation)
