= Antonio Cipolla =

Italian architect (1820–1874)

Antonio Cipolla (4 February 1820 – 15 July 1874) was an Italian architect, active in an academic neo-Renaissance style.

He was born in Naples and initially studied there under E. Alvino, but in 1845 gained a scholarship from the Academy of Fine Arts of Naples, to study in Rome. In 1848, he interrupted his studies to fight against the French in the Veneto during the revolution.

In 1852-1854, he obtained a commission from the Neapolitan monarchy to refurbish the church of Santo Spirito dei Napoletani located on via Giulia in Rome. His next major commission was to help refurbish the Farnese Palace in Rome for the exiled former King of Naples, Francis II. During the following years he designed a variety of funeral monuments in Rome.

In Bologna, he designed the Palazzi Silvani located between piazza Cavour and piazza San Domenico. For the Silvani family, he designed the Monument to Antonio Silvani, of Cella Silvani, in the Sala del Colombario of the Certosa di Bologna. The marble bust depicting Silvani was sculpted by Pietro Tenerani.

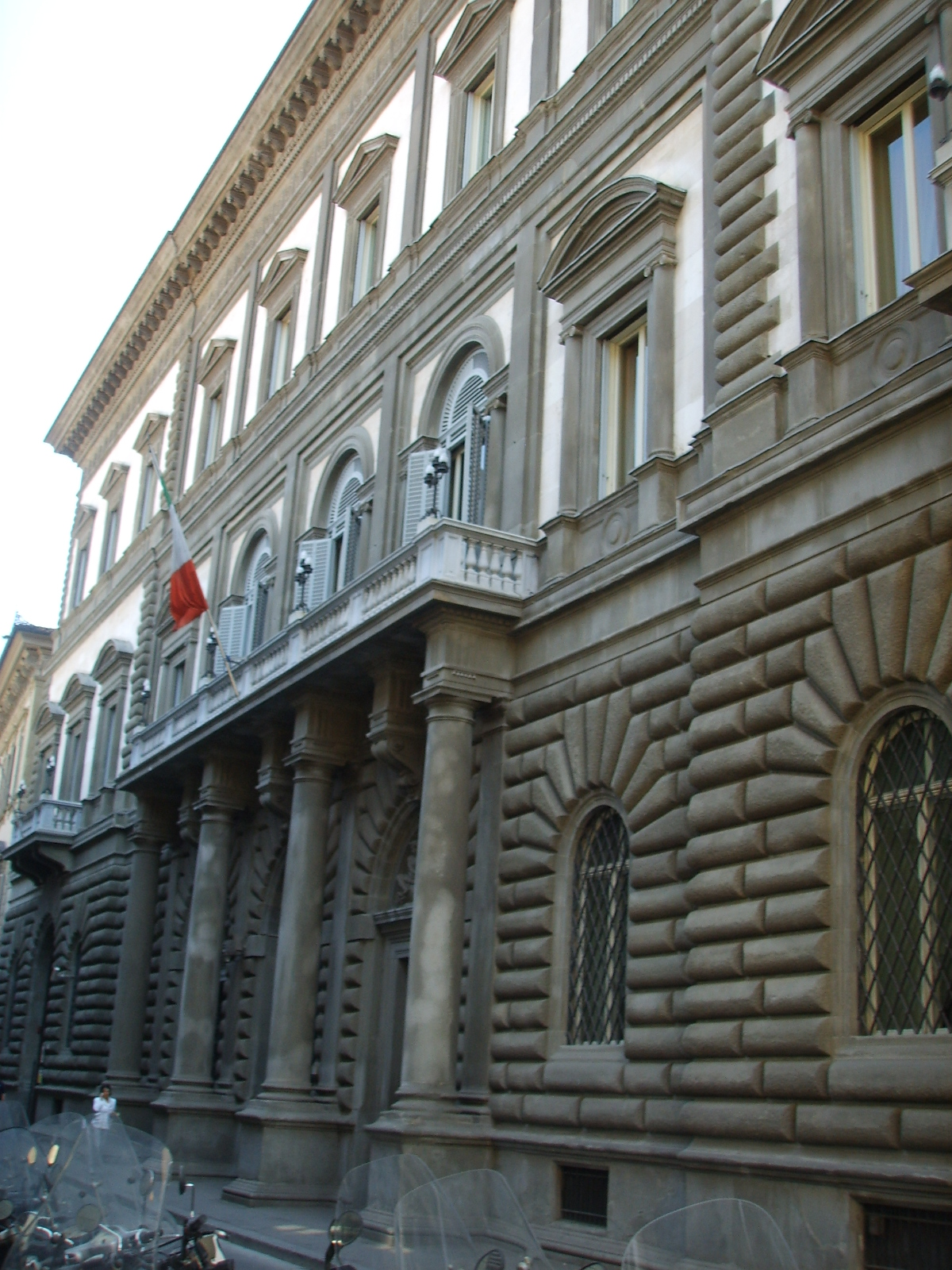
Banca d'Italia building in Florence

In Bologna, he also designed (1862–65) the Palazzo della Banca Nazionale, later Banca d'Italia. He built similar structures for the National Bank in Florence (completed in 1869) and for the Cassa di Risparmio di Roma on Via del Corso. For the design of the latter, Cipolla won a competition in 1864, with an award of 1000 scudi. Construction took place 1869-1874. Major interior rooms of the building, known as Palazzo Cipolla, were decorated with paintings by Cecrope Barilli, D. Bruschi, and D. Natali, and statues by O. Garofoli.

He competed for the design of the facade of the Cathedral of Florence, but lost out to Emilio De Fabris. He was employed by the Savoy Monarchy in various projects around Rome. From 1870 to 1874, he formed part of a commission studying the urban refurbishment and expansion of Rome. He helped design the urban development of Prati di Castello neighborhood. He designed the Anglican church of the Trinity in piazza San Silvestro in Rome, however this church was demolished in 1941. Cipolla left many of his designs to the Accademia di San Luca. He died in Rome.
