= Frombork =

Town in Warmian-Masurian Voivodeship, Poland

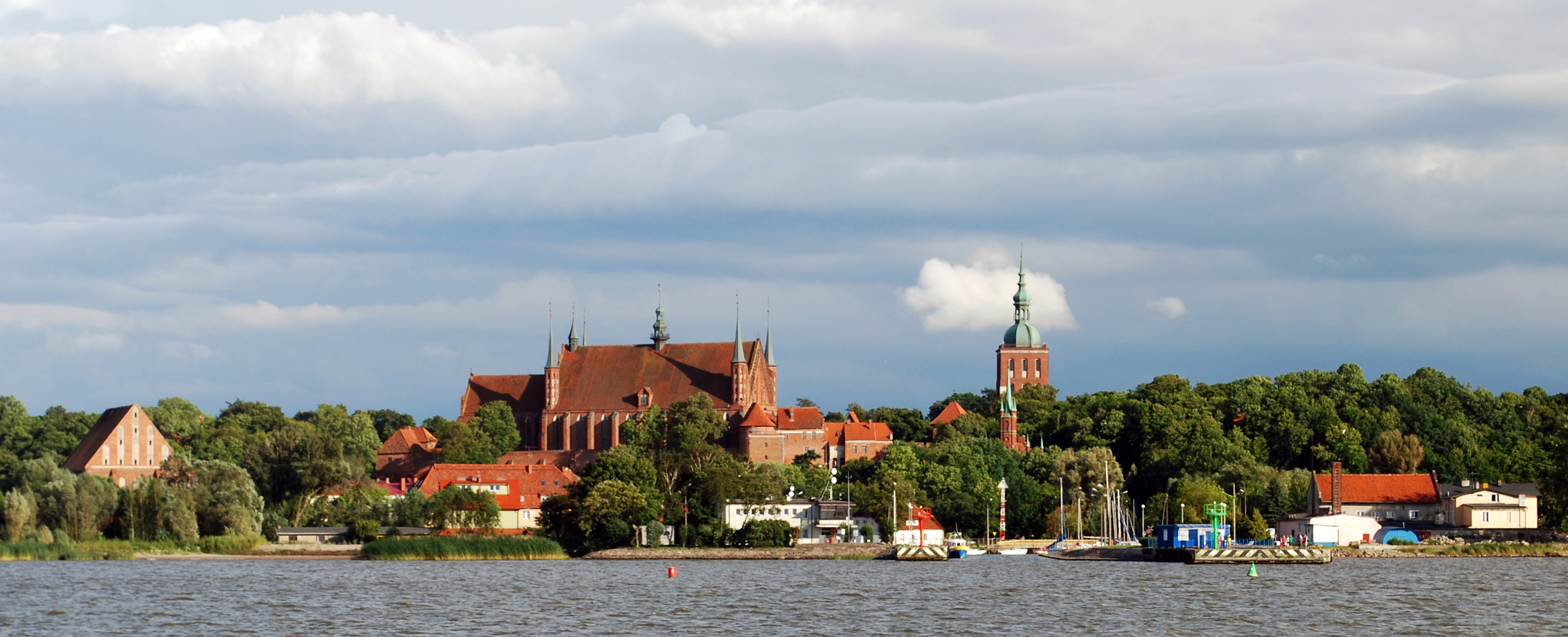
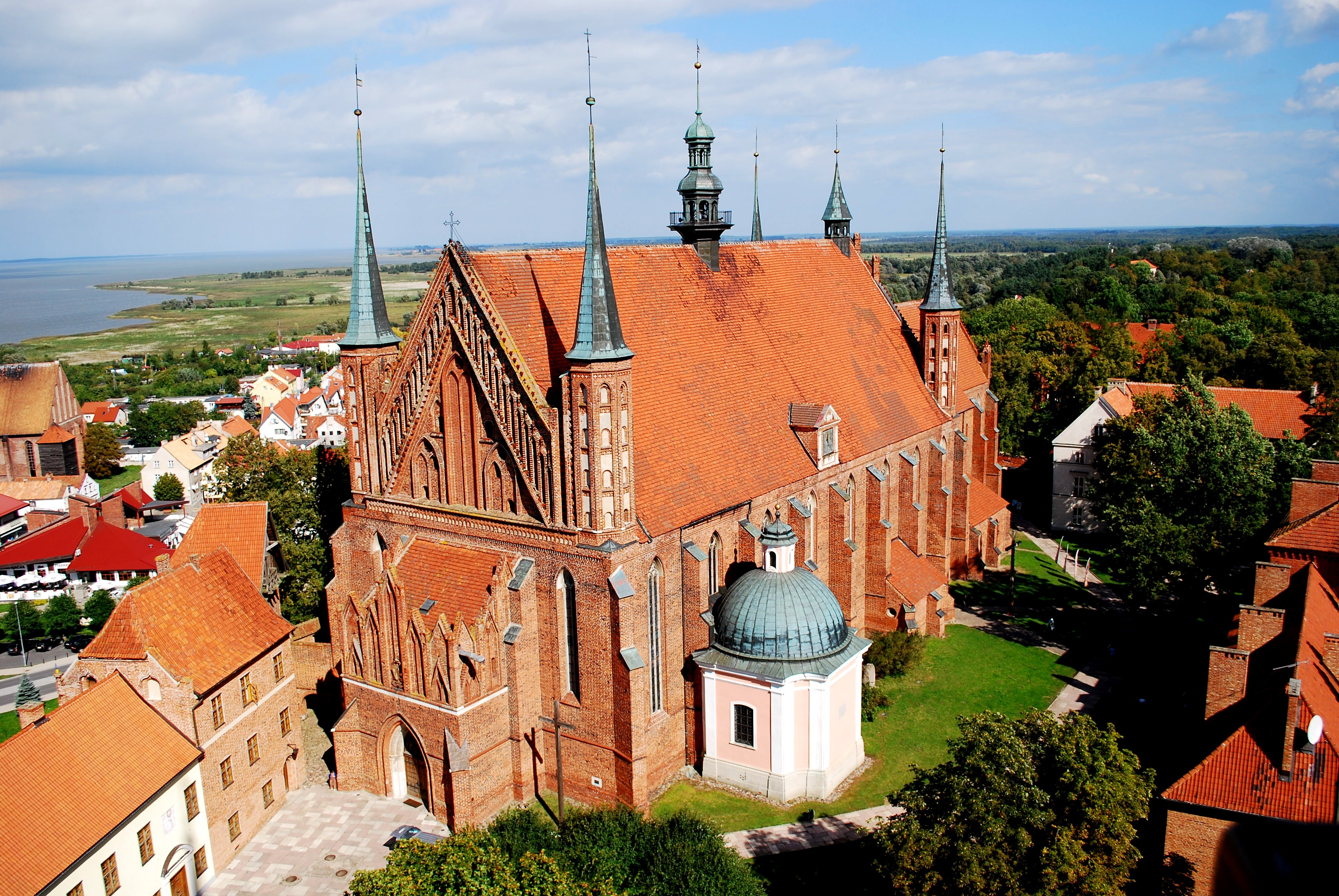
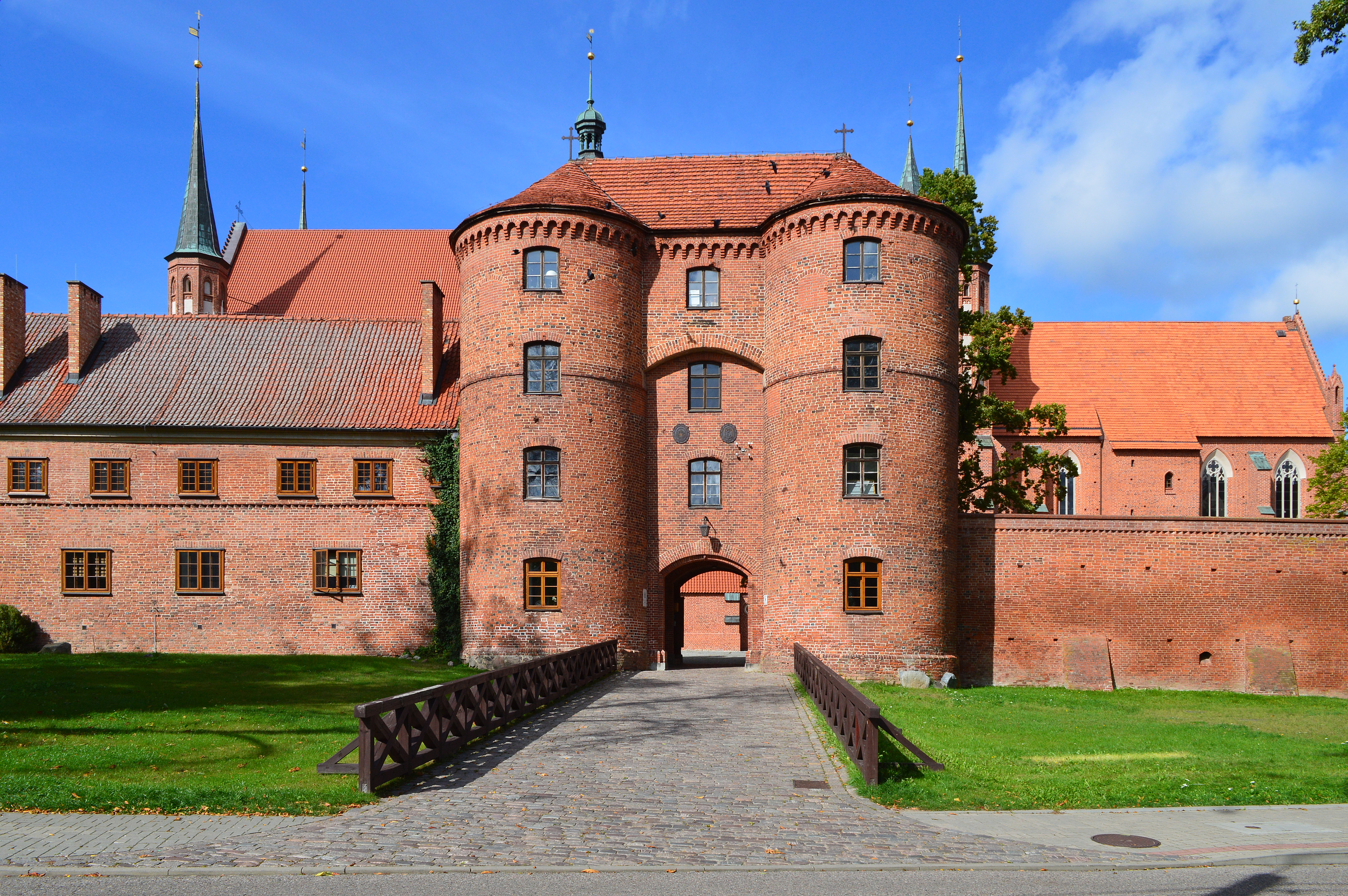
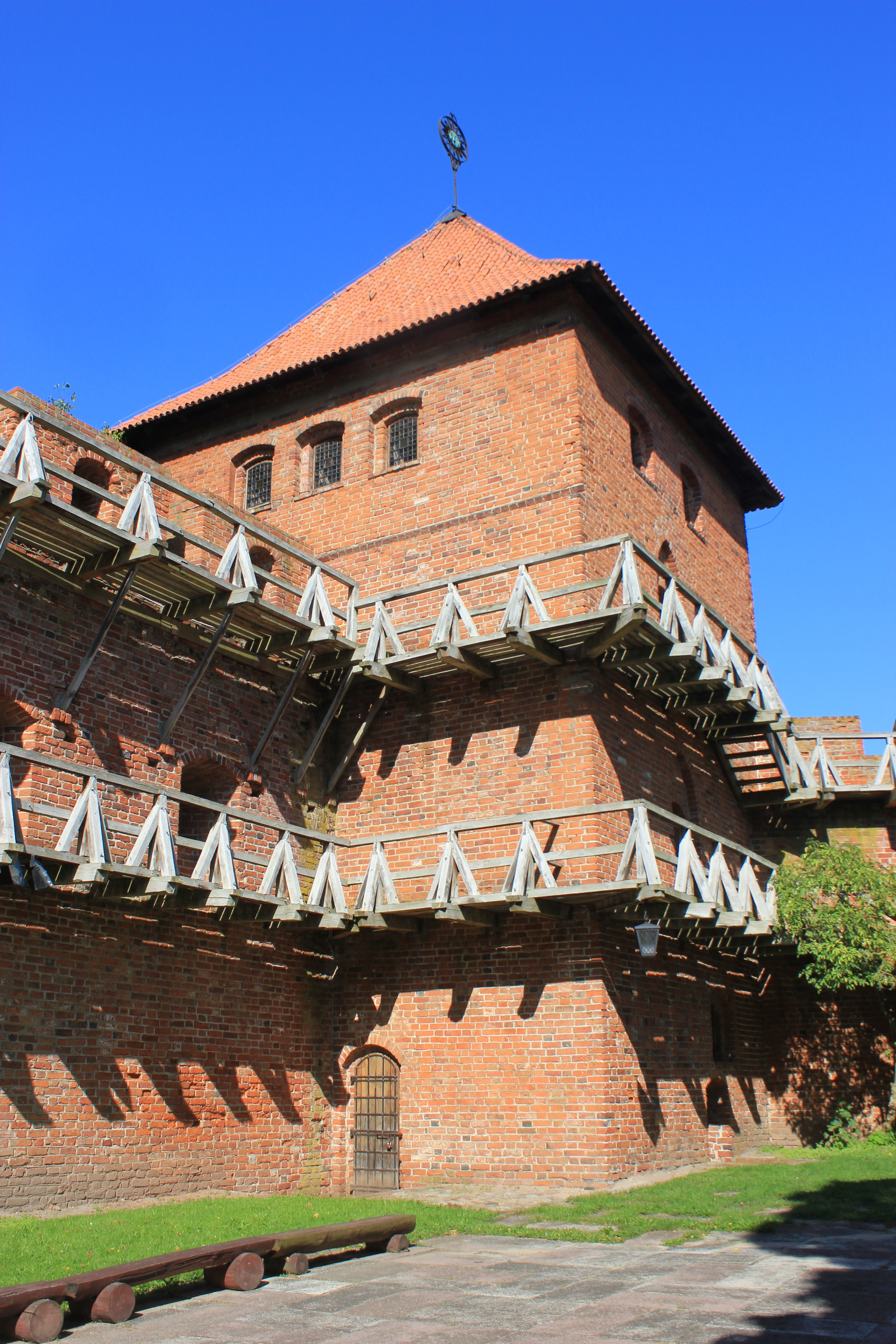
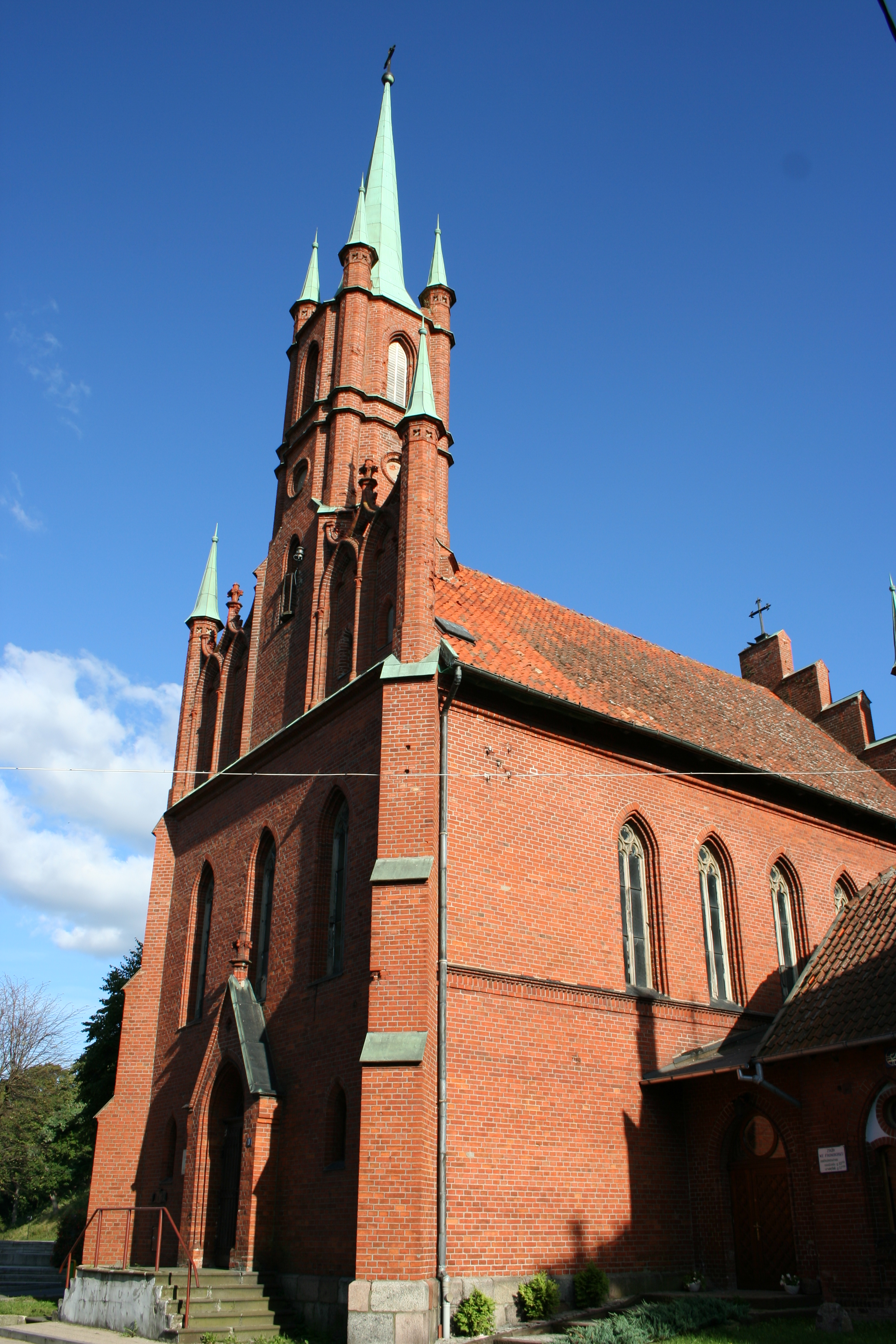
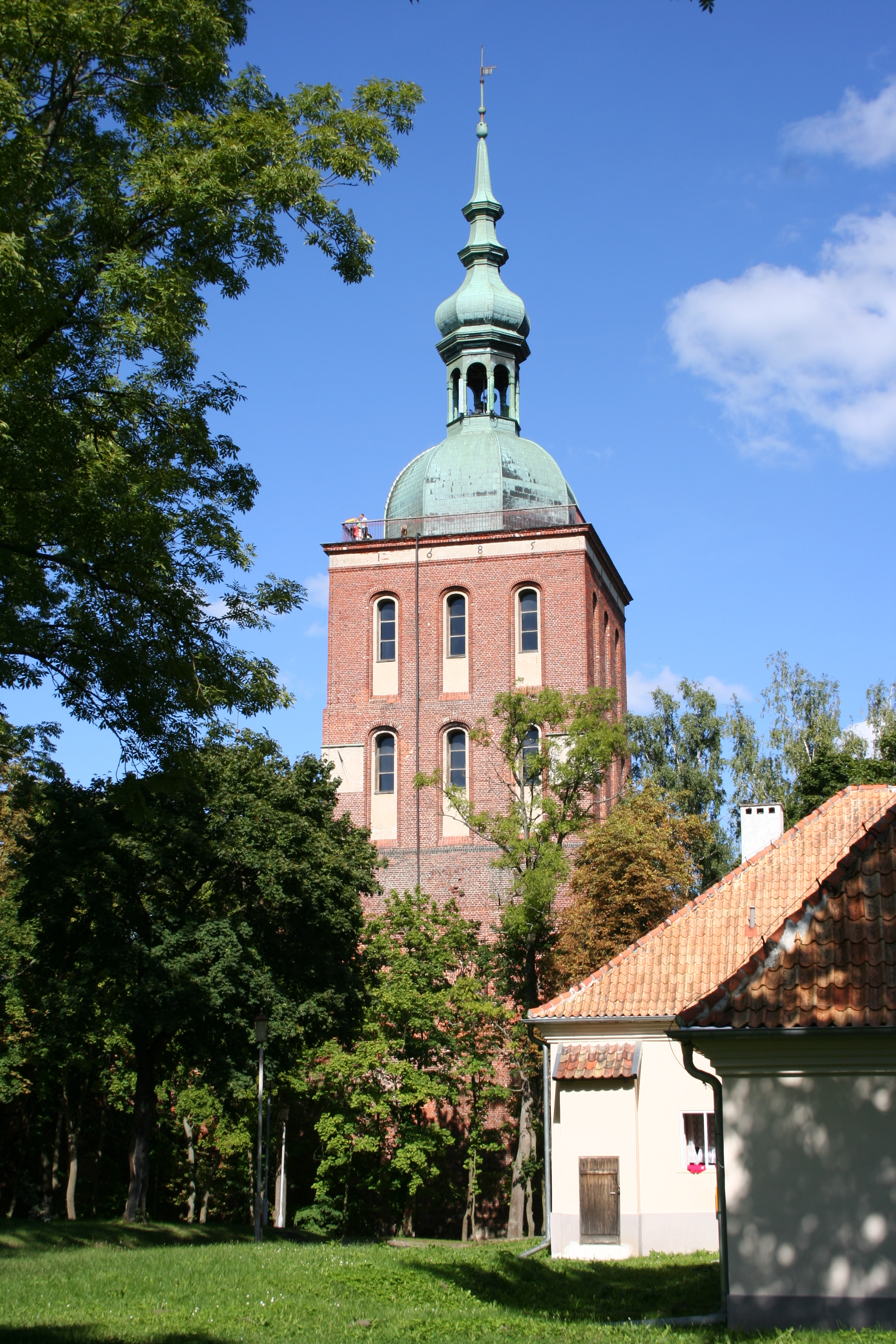
- Panorama of Frombork Frombork Cathedral South Gate Copernicus Tower Saint Adalbert church Radziejowski Tower

- Flag Coat of arms
- Interactive map of Frombork
- Location within Poland
- Coordinates: 54°21′N 19°41′E
- Country: Poland
- Voivodeship: Warmian-Masurian
- County: Braniewo
- Gmina: Frombork
- Established: 13th century
- First mentioned: 1278
- Town rights: 1310

Government
  - Mayor: Zbigniew Pietkiewicz

Area
  - Total: 7.59 km^{2} (2.93 sq mi)

Population (31 December 2021)
  - Total: 2,260
  - Density: 298/km^{2} (771/sq mi)
- Time zone: UTC+1 (CET)
  - Summer (DST): UTC+2 (CEST)
- Postal code: 14-530
- Area code: +48 55
- Car plates: NBR
- Website: www.frombork.pl

Frombork (Polish: [ˈfrɔmbɔrk]; German: Frauenburg [ˈfʁaʊənbʊʁk]) is a town in northern Poland, situated on the Vistula Lagoon in Braniewo County, within Warmian–Masurian Voivodeship. As of December 2021, it has a population of 2,260.

First mentioned in a 13th-century document, Frombork is one of the oldest and historically most important towns of the historical region of Warmia. In the early 16th century it was the residence of the astronomer Nicolaus Copernicus, who used it as a site for several of his observations.

The town and its 14th-century cathedral were badly damaged in World War II. After the war the cathedral complex was meticulously reconstructed and is again a popular tourist destination, listed as a Historic Monument of Poland. It contains the grave of Copernicus and is the seat of the Roman Catholic Archdiocese of Warmia.

Frombork is known as "The Jewel of Warmia" because of its many historical sites. The Museum of Copernicus in Frombork holds exhibitions related to the astronomer, as well as to astronomy in general, and includes a planetarium. One of the biggest attractions is also the annual International Festival of Organ Music, held every summer.

== History ==
=== Medieval period ===
The town was founded as a defensive stronghold on an Old Prussian site. In 1224 at Catania, Emperor Frederick II declared Prussia directly subordinate to the church and Holy Roman Empire. Later in the same year the pope assigned Bishop William of Modena as the papal legate to Prussia. With the imperial Golden Bull of Rimini, the Teutonic Knights were granted control of the region, which they subsequently conquered. According to a local legend, the Old Prussian inhabitants were baptised by Anselm of Meissen, a priest of the Teutonic Knights and the first Bishop of the Bishopric of Warmia which was created in 1242 by William of Modena.

Supposedly when the stronghold's lord died, his widow Gertruda offered the settlement to the bishop, and in her honor it was named "Frauenburg" (German for "Our Lady's fortress", "Castrum Dominae Nostrae" in Latin). This name is not unique in German, as it usually originates in the construction of a fortified chapel, church, or monastery dedicated to the Virgin Mary or inhabited by nuns. Several places were thus named Frauenburg or Marienburg, like the nearby Marienburg castle and city (now Malbork).

The village was first mentioned in a 1278 document signed by Bishop Heinrich Fleming. On 8 July 1310, Bishop Eberhard of Neisse granted the town Lübeck city rights, as used by many member cities of the Hanseatic League. It was described, still rather unspecifically, as Civitas Warmiensis (Warmian city).

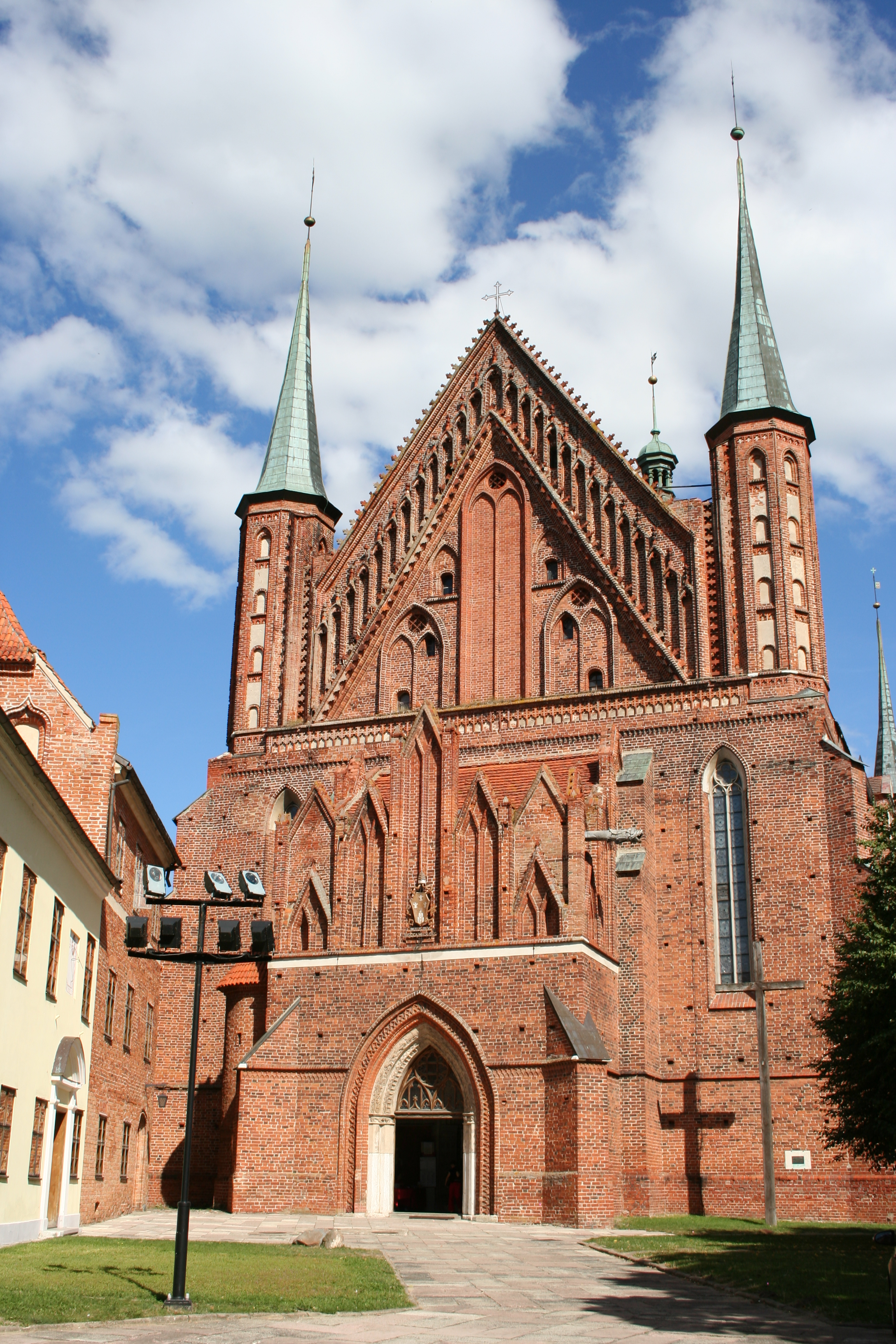
Frombork Cathedral

In 1329–1388, the magnificent Brick Gothic cathedral (now the Archcathedral Basilica of the Assumption of the Blessed Virgin Mary and Saint Andrew) was built, and was dedicated to the Virgin Mary, or "Our Lady".

Over the centuries, the cathedral has been expanded and rebuilt repeatedly. There are also several other historic churches, dedicated to St. Nicholas, St. George, and St. Anne, all built in the 13th century. In 1414, the town was plundered and burned during the Hunger War between the Teutonic Knights and Poland. In 1440, the town joined the anti-Teutonic Prussian Confederation, at the request of which Polish King Casimir IV Jagiellon signed the act of incorporation of the region into the Crown of the Kingdom of Poland in 1454. In 1454, the Warmian Chapter paid homage to King Casimir IV Jagiellon, recognizing him as rightful ruler. In retaliation the Teutonic Knights invaded the town in the same year. In 1455, Czech mercenaries in the service of Poland, commanded by Jan Skalski, took back the city. Frombork was recognized as part of the Polish Kingdom by the Second Peace of Thorn (1466). It became an important town of the Prince-Bishopric of Warmia and part of the province of Royal Prussia within the larger Greater Poland Province. The town was also devastated after a raid by Albert, Grand Master of the Teutonic Knights in 1520 during the Polish–Teutonic War of 1519–1521.

=== Copernican era ===
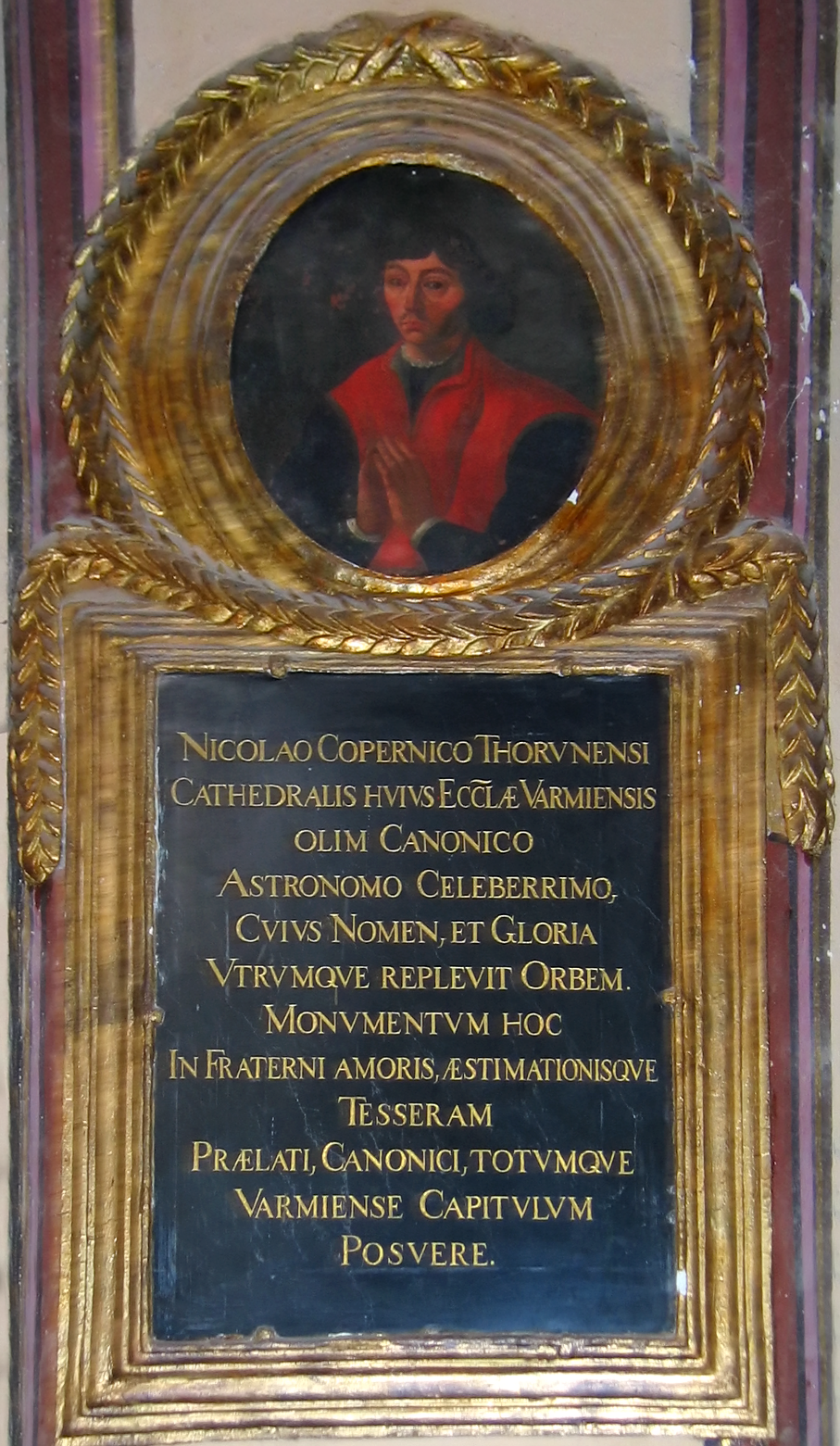
Epitaph of Nicolaus Copernicus in Frombork Cathedral

In the Middle Ages, the inhabitants were mainly merchants, farmers and fishermen. The most famous resident was the astronomer and mathematician Nicolaus Copernicus, who lived and worked here as a canon (1512–16 and 1522–43). Copernicus is said to have jokingly called it "Weiberstadt" ("Wives' Town") or "Gynepolis" (in Medieval Greek). In 1519 Copernicus wrote to the King of Poland, asking for help against the Teutonic Knights who were threatening the city. The letter however was intercepted, and the Teutonic Knights took and burned the city (Copernicus and other canons had left the city shortly before).

The astronomer wrote his epochal work, De revolutionibus orbium cœlestium in Frombork. In his book, written in Latin, Copernicus used the Latin name of the town and region - Frueburgo Prussiae. Shortly after its 1543 publication, Copernicus died there and was buried in the town's cathedral where there is a monument to him bearing the inscription Astronomo celeberrimo, cujus nomen et gloria utrumque implevit orbem (Most renowned astronomer, whose name and glory filled both worlds). His grave was thought to have been found by archaeologists in 2005, when the body was exhumed and subsequently confirmed in November 2008 by the publication of the results of DNA tests on fragments of bone and hair found on the skeleton. The body was reinterred on Sunday May 23, 2010 in the Catholic church of Frombork. Hair that matched two strands of hair which belonged to Copernicus are currently located in Uppsala University.

In the northwest corner of the cathedral grounds is Copernicus' tower, and in the southwest corner an octagonal building with a square bell tower and a small planetarium and a Foucault's pendulum. From atop the tower one can survey the town, the tiny harbor, the panorama of the Baltic Sea, and much of Warmia's countryside.

=== Modern history ===
Frombork suffered destruction and heavy population losses during the Polish–Swedish wars. Between 1626 and 1635 it was occupied by Gustavus Adolphus of Sweden who looted the cathedral and shipped many cultural artifacts, including Copernicus' manuscripts to Sweden. Further destruction followed during the Deluge (Swedish invasion of Poland of 1655–1660), the Great Northern War and the War of the Fourth Coalition.

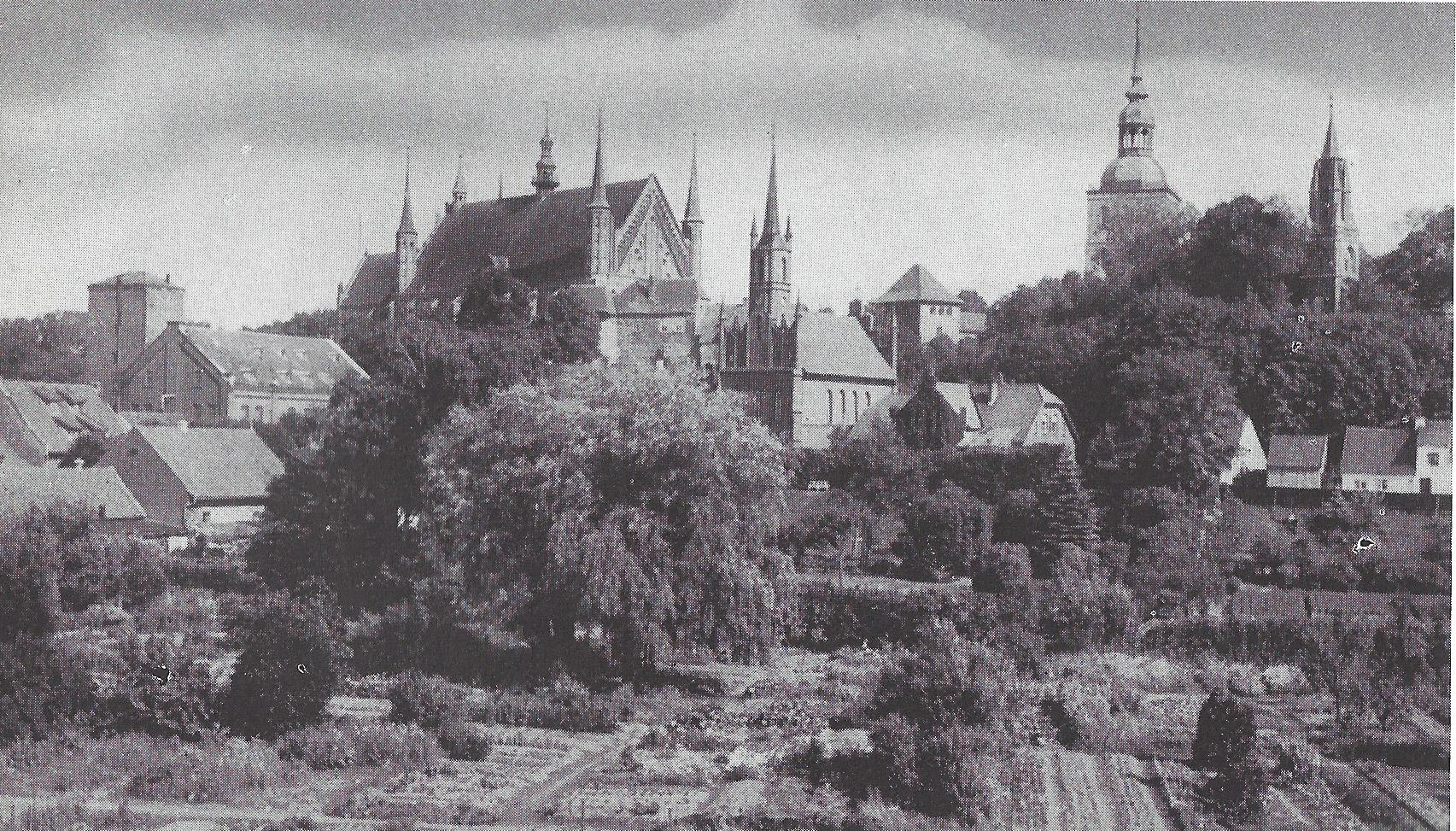
View of the Cathedral Hill in the 1930s

After the First Partition of Poland (1772) the town was taken over by the Kingdom of Prussia and in 1773 it became part of the newly established province of East Prussia. Following the unsuccessful Polish November Uprising, hundreds of Polish insurgents, including professors and students of the Wilno University, were interned in the town in 1832. With the unification of Germany in 1871, Frauenburg became part of the German Empire. The Preußische Ostbahn railway line was opened in 1899 connecting Elbing (present-day Elbląg) and Braunsberg (present-day Braniewo) via Frauenburg, leading further to the Russian border at Eydtkuhnen (present-day Chernyshevskoye). Passenger services on the railway line ceased in early 2006.

After German surrender in World War II, sovereignty over the town was ceremoniously transferred to Polish authorities on August 5, 1945. The unilateral Soviet transfer of power to Poland was accepted according to the Potsdam Agreement, however, under preliminary terms. Towards and after the end of World War II the German inhabitants had either been evacuated or expelled in accordance with the Potsdam Agreement. The town was resettled by Poles, many of whom were expelleés from Polish areas annexed by the Soviet Union.

In 1959, Frombork regained its city rights. Having been heavily (70%) damaged in World War II, it was rebuilt by Polish Boy Scouts and others in 1966–1973, in time for the 500th anniversary of Copernicus' birth. Between 1975 and 1998 Frombork was part of the Elbląg Voivodeship.

Today, Frombork is regaining its importance as a tourist destination, aided by its key location just south of the frontier with the Russian Kaliningrad Oblast. Although the railway through Frombork closed in 2006, the port has seasonal ferry connections with Elbląg, Krynica Morska and Kaliningrad.

== Sights ==
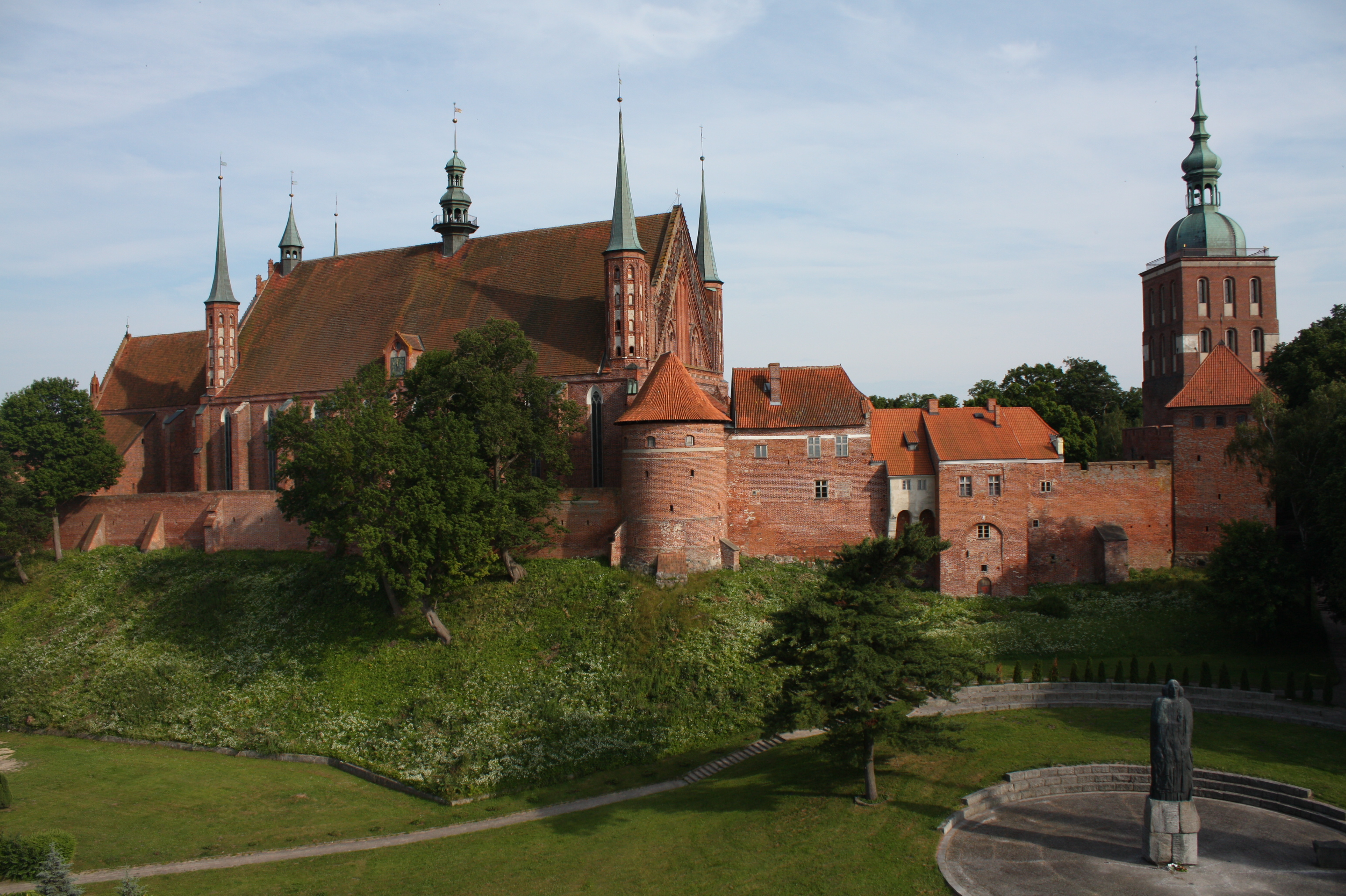
Cathedral Hill, with statue of Nicolaus Copernicus

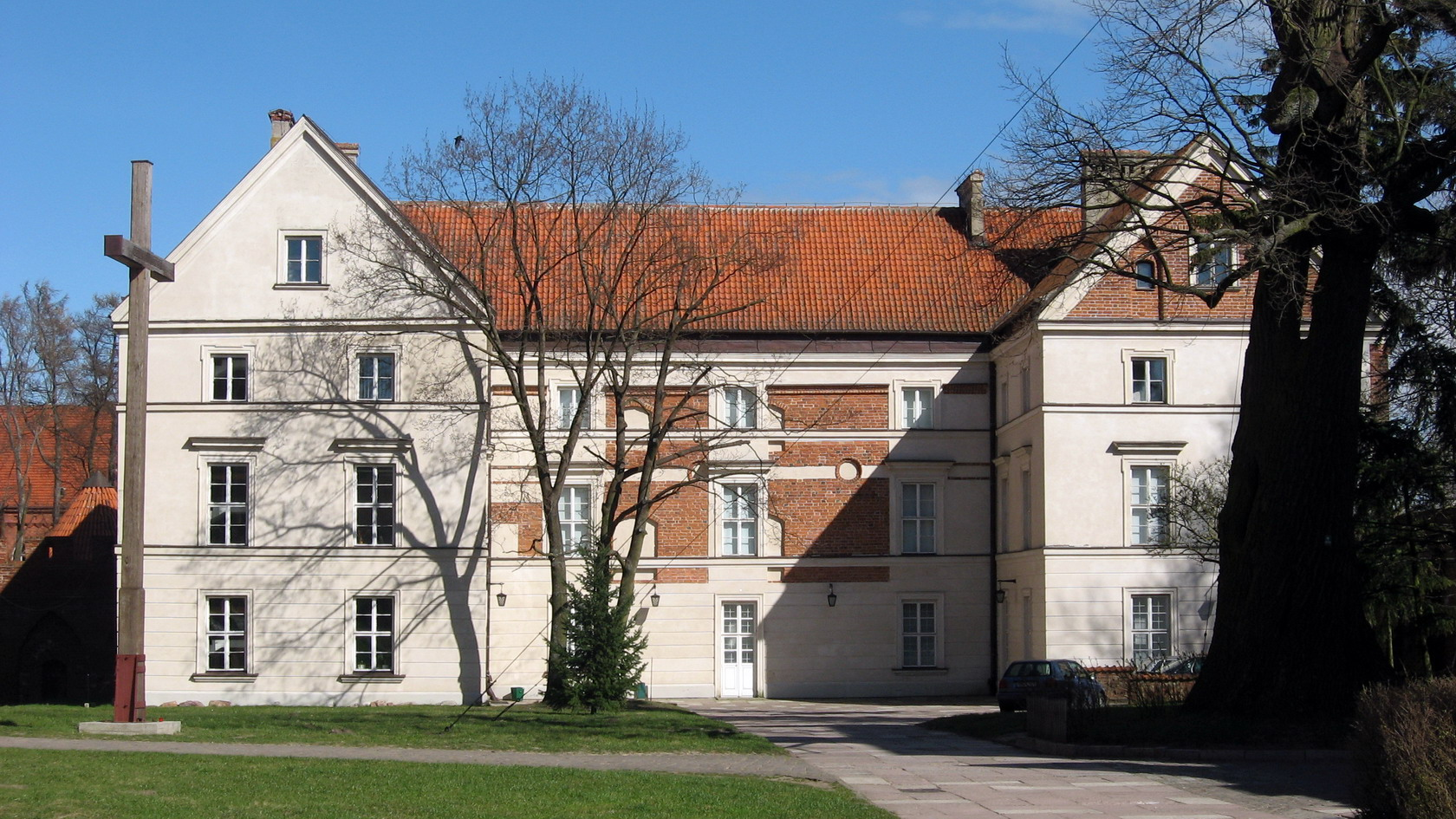
Old episcopal palace, now the Nicolaus Copernicus Museum

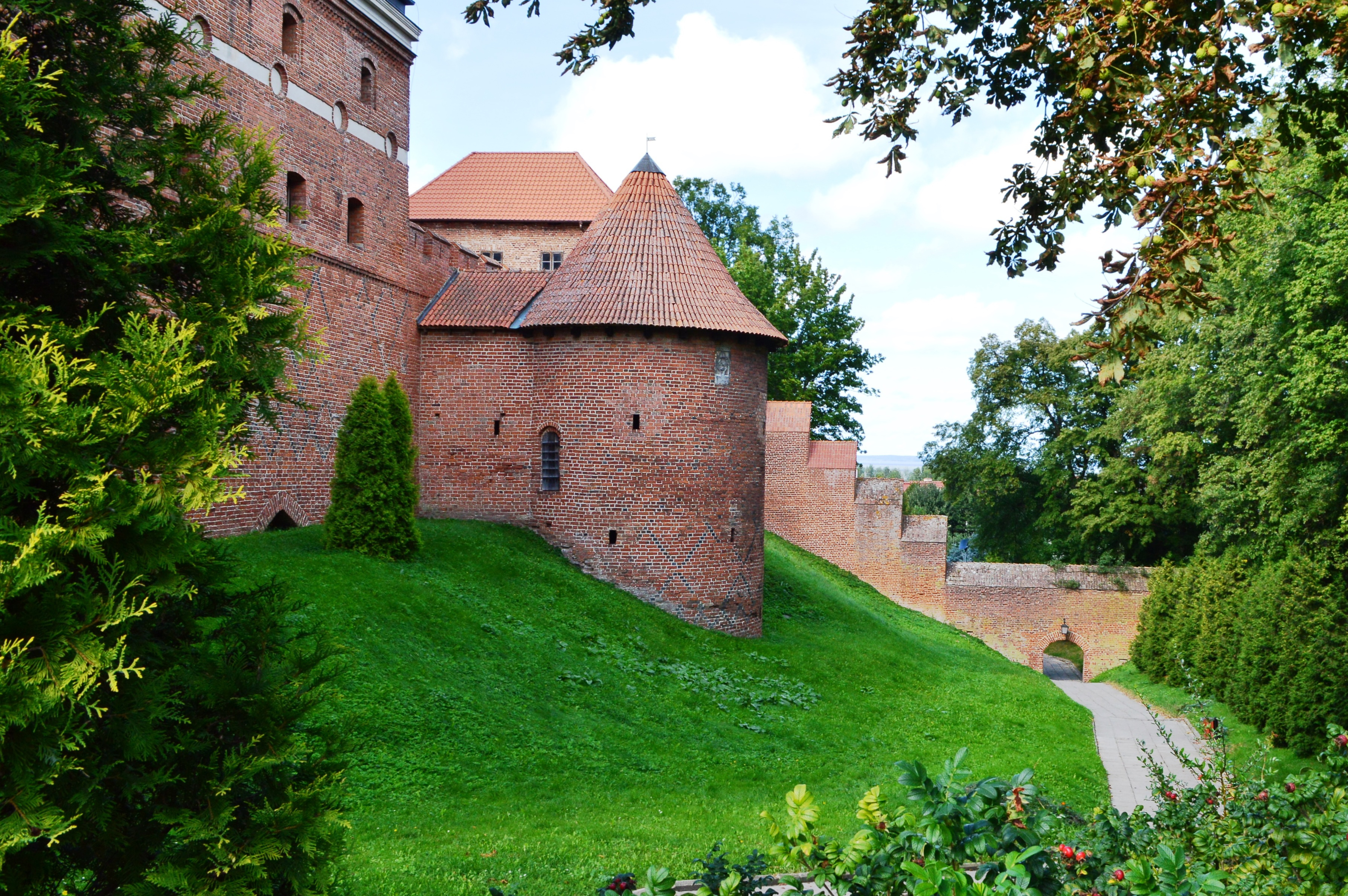
East Tower

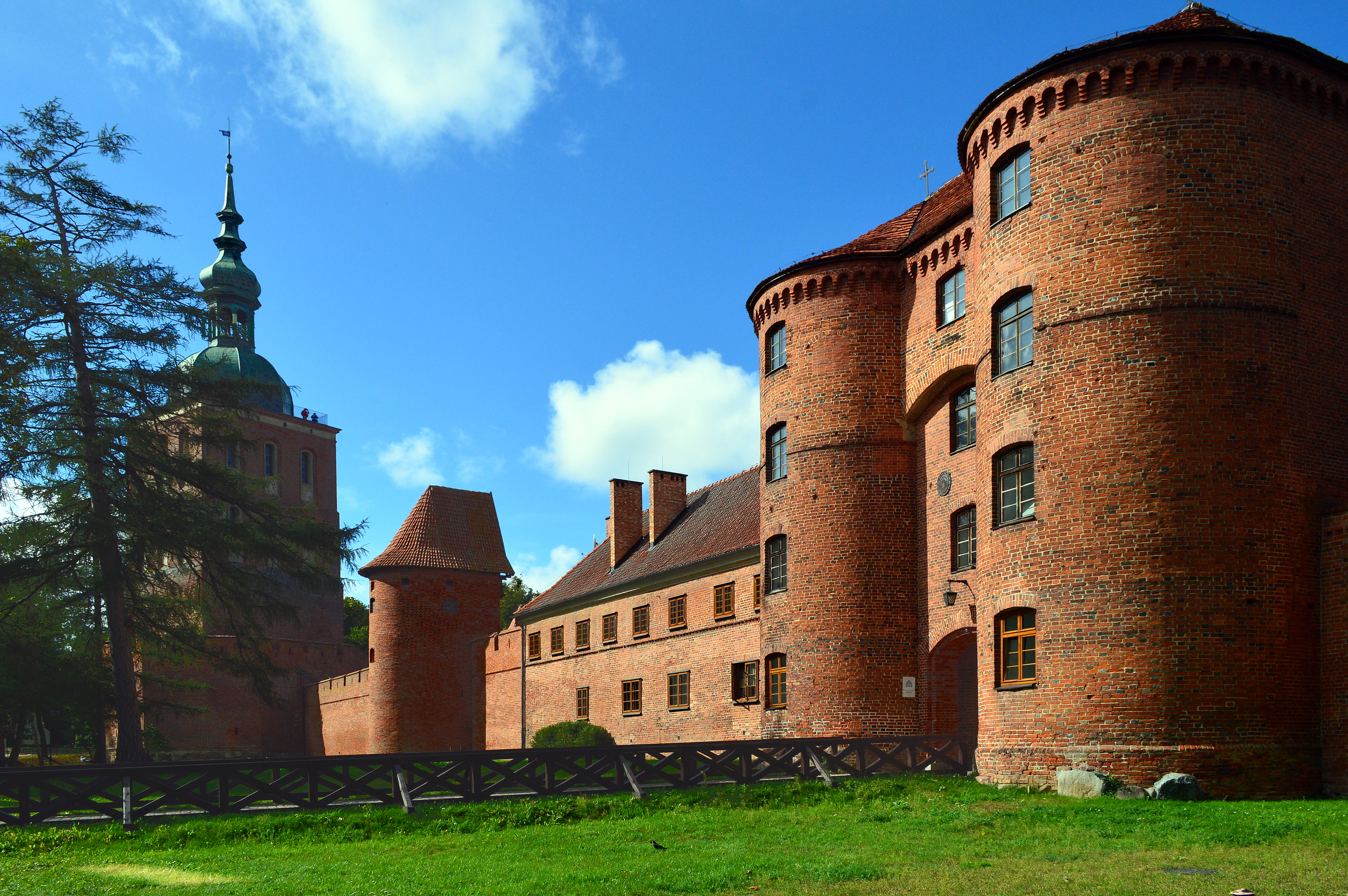
Radziejowski Tower, South Tower and South Gate

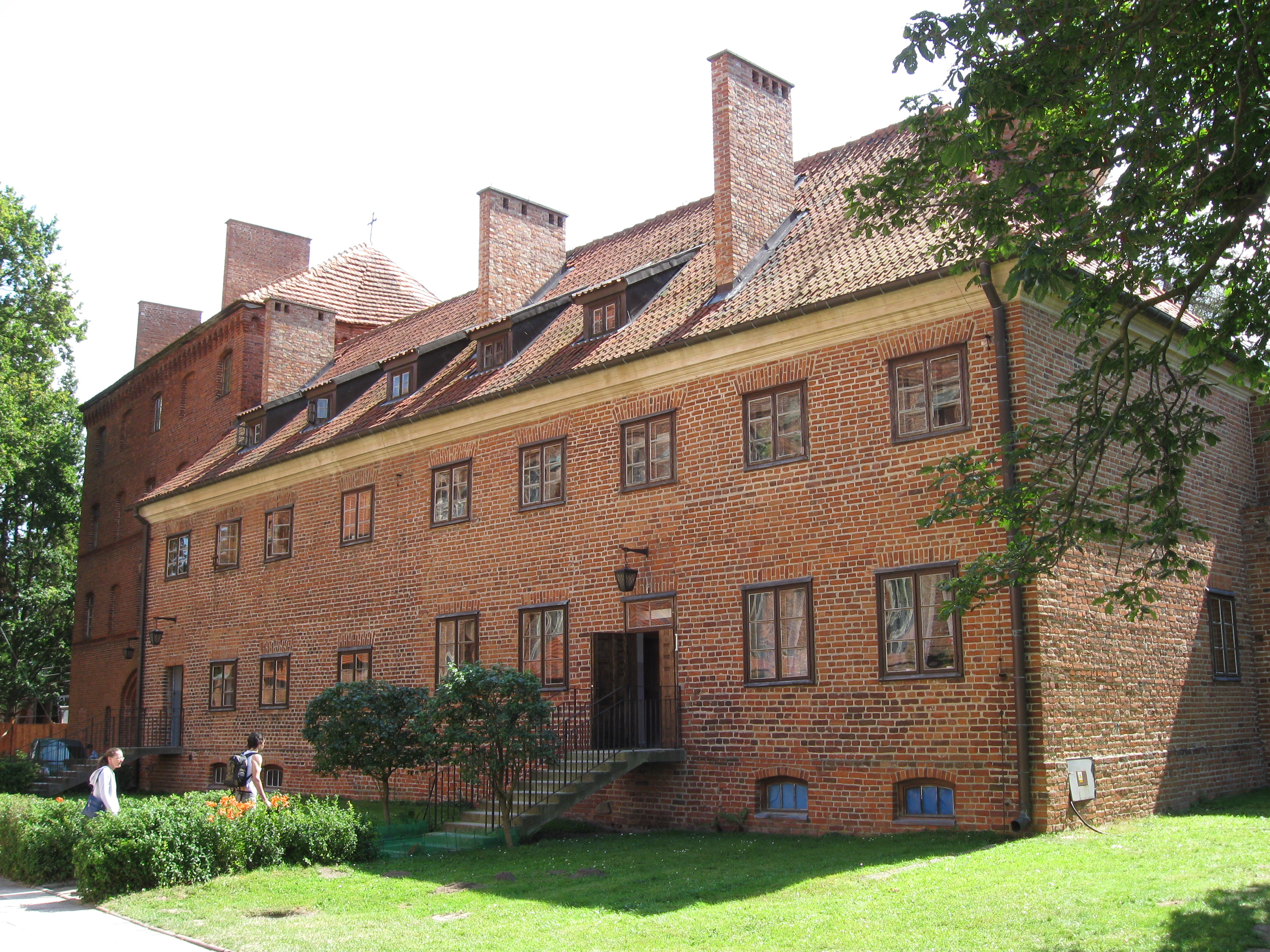
New Vicariate

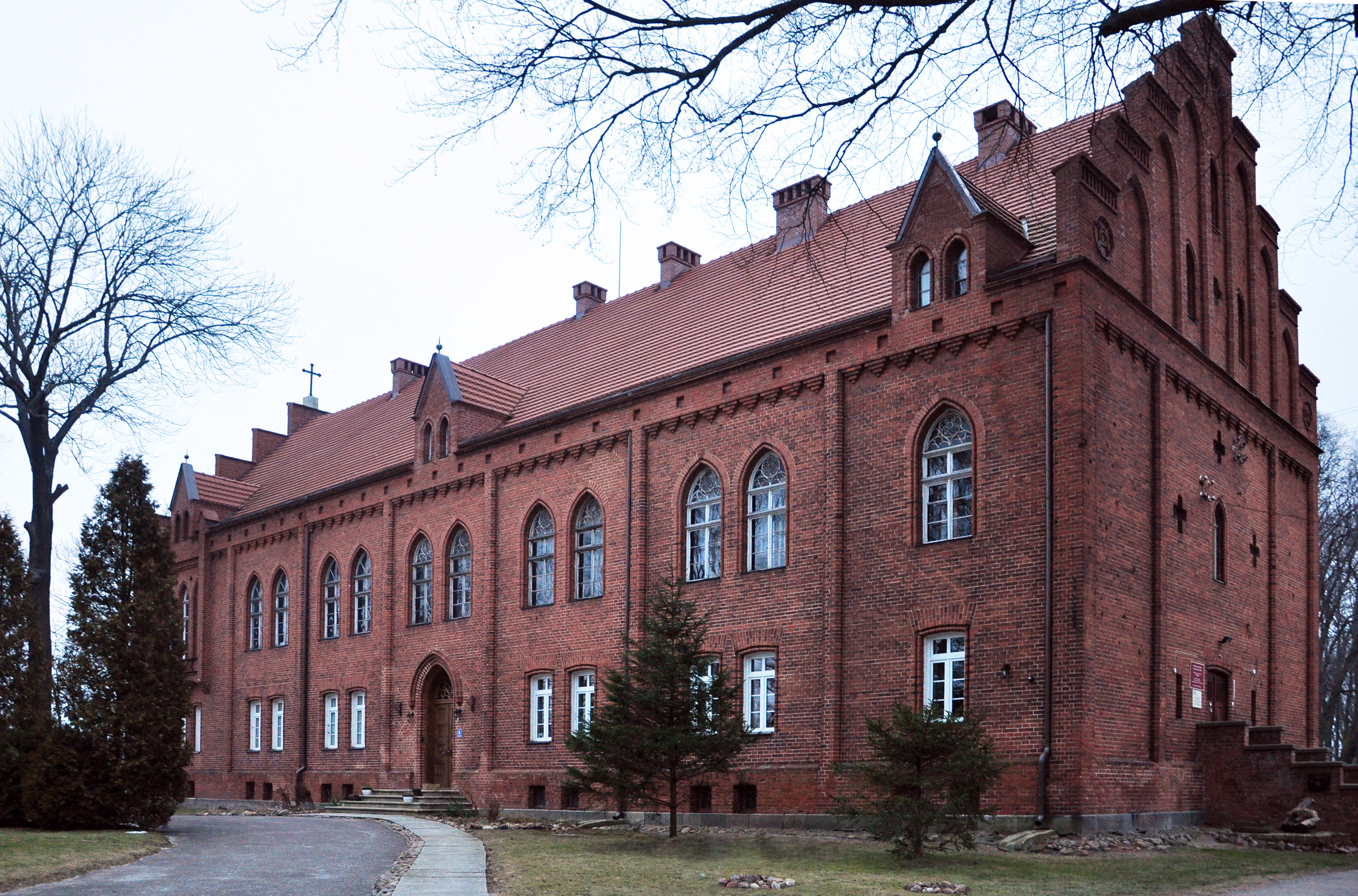
New episcopal palace

The greatest landmark of Frombork is the fortified Cathedral Hill with the Gothic Archcathedral Basilica of the Assumption of the Blessed Virgin Mary and Saint Andrew, where Nicolaus Copernicus is buried, the Copernicus Tower, the Radziejowski Tower, which contains a Foucault pendulum, the Old Bishop's Palace, which houses the Nicolaus Copernicus Museum, and other historical buildings. Other sights include:

- former Holy Spirit Hospital, now housing the History of Medicine Department of the Nicolaus Copernicus Museum
- Gothic Church of Saint Nicholas
- medieval Copernicus Canal
- medieval Baszta Żeglarska (Sailing Tower)
- Renaissance water tower, the oldest in Poland
- several historic canonries.

== Monuments ==
Several monuments are on display in Frombork (see external links):

- monument to Nicolaus Copernicus, was replaced in the mid-1950s as the monument erected by Imperial Germany's Wilhelm II was destroyed in World War II
- memorial honoring the Boy Scouts and others who took part in "Operation 1001" of 1966–73, the rebuilding of the town from its devastation in World War II
- Katyn massacre memorial
- monument to people of the former province of East Prussia who drowned in the Vistula Lagoon when fleeing the Soviets in 1944–1945, made from a glacial erratic rock found in the water
- Copernicus' astronomical observatory, work room, instruments and planetarium are on display at Frombork's Copernicus Museum
- monument honoring Red Army soldiers, inscribed: "Glory to the Red Army heroes fallen in liberating Frombork"

== Transport ==
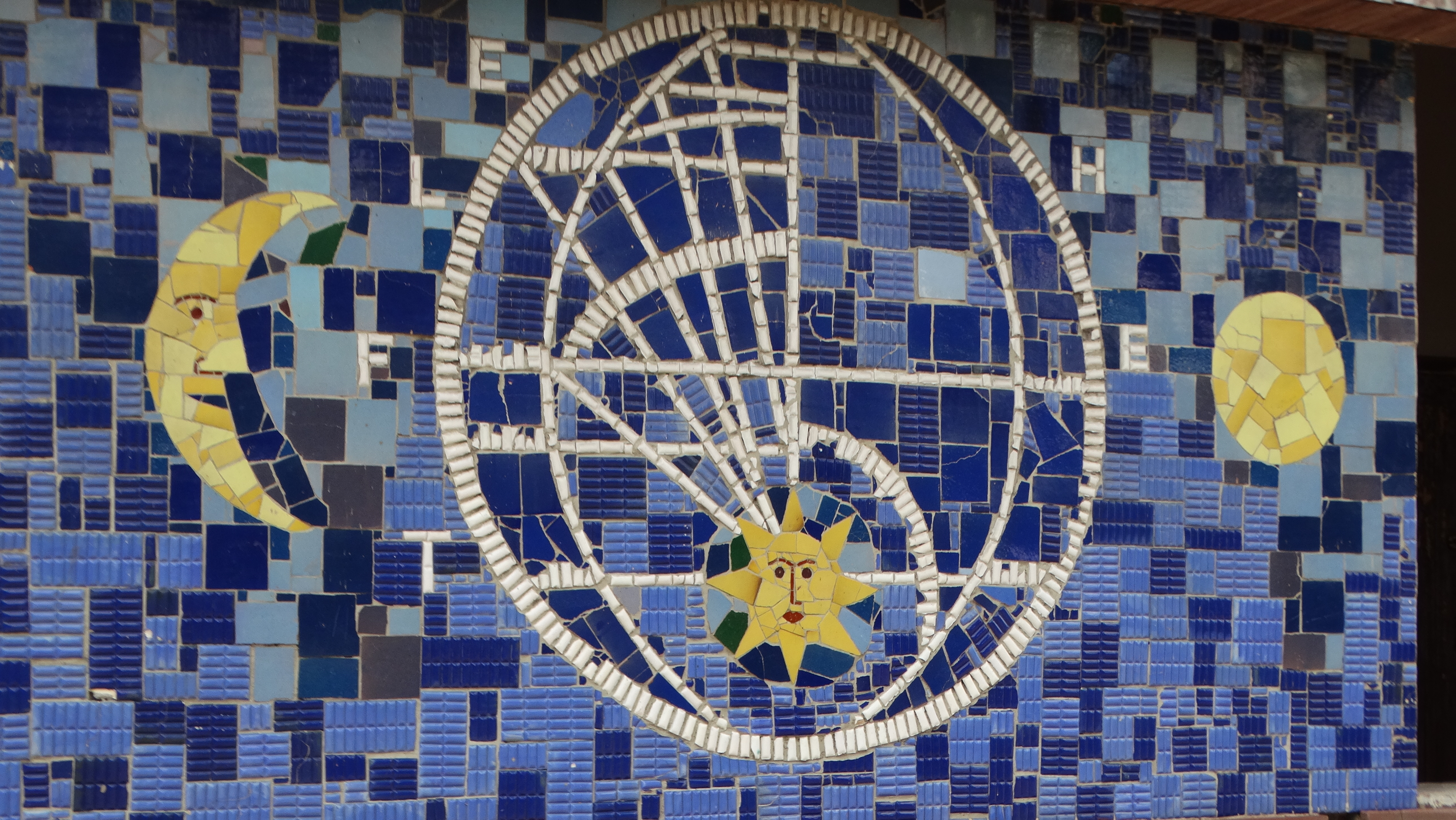
Mosaic at the railway station

Frombork is located at the intersection of Voivodeship roads 504 and 505.

From Frombork, it is possible to sail from the pier in Krynica Morska by water tram via Tolkmicko or by ship.

Although inactive since 2013, Frombork's railway station rests on line No. 254 (formerly Nadzalewowa Railway).

In the year 1897, the construction of the Nadzalewowa Railway (German: Haffuferbahn, HUB) began - a railway line that was intended by German designers to connect Elbląg with Königsberg (Polish: Królewiec). In May 1899, the section from Elbląg to Frombork was completed, and in September, the segment connecting Frombork to Braniewo was put into service.

Regular passenger train service on the route was suspended on April 1, 2006. Since then, only special and freight trains operated here. In the years 2010 and 2011, thanks to the efforts of the Pomorskie Society of Railway Enthusiasts, special services were resumed during the summer, on Saturdays and Sundays, running from Grudziądz and Elbląg to Braniewo, with stops at this station. The last passenger train stopped here on July 7, 2013.

== Sports ==
The local football club is Zalew Frombork. It competes in the lower leagues.

== International relations ==
=== Twin towns – sister cities ===
Frombork is twinned with:

- Sucha Beskidzka, Poland
- Kazlų Rūda, Lithuania
- Szypliszki, Poland

=== Former twin towns ===
- Svetly, Russia
- Myadzyel, Belarus

On 24 March 2022, Frombork terminated its partnership with Russian and Belarusian cities as a response to the 2022 Russian invasion of Ukraine.
