= Congregation of the Holy Ghost =

The name Congregation of the Holy Ghost applies to five Catholic Congregations: the Congregation of the Holy Spirit (Spiritans) and four female congregations:

- Congregation of the Holy Spirit (C.S.Sp.), also known as the Spiritans or Holy Ghost Fathers
- Daughters of the Holy Spirit, a worldwide order of nuns dedicated to education
- Sisters of the Holy Ghost (Dubuque), a congregation founded in 1890, by the Archbishop of Dubuque, Iowa, John Hennessey
- Missionary Sisters Servants of the Holy Spirit, the sister organisation of the Society of the Divine Word
- Sisters of the Holy Spirit and Mary Immaculate, established in 1893 at San Antonio, Texas.
