= Santo Spirito =

Santo Spirito or Spirito Santo (Italian forms of 'Holy Spirit') may refer to:

== Abbeys ==
- Santo Spirito d'Ocre, Province of L'Aquila, Italy
- Abbey of the Holy Spirit at Monte Morrone, Sulmona (Abbazia di Santo Spirito al Morrone, Sulmona), Province of L'Aquila, Italy

== Churches ==
- Santo Spirito, Bergamo, Lombardy, Italy
- Santo Spirito, Cingoli, Marche, Italy
- Santo Spirito, Florence, Italy
- Santo Spirito dei Napoletani, Rome, Italy
- Santo Spirito in Sassia, Rome, Italy
- Santo Spirito (Siena), Tuscany, Italy
- Santo Spirito, Urbania, Marche, Italy
- Santo Spirito, Venice, Venice, Italy
- Spirito Santo, Cortona, Tuscany, Italy
- Spirito Santo, Erice, Sicily, Italy
- Spirito Santo alla Ferratella, Rome, Italy

== Other uses ==
- Banco di Santo Spirito, Italy
- Ospedale di Santo Spirito in Sassia, the oldest hospital in Europe (opened 727 AD), located in Rome
- Santo Spirito Hospital, Rabat, Malta
- Santo Spirito (island), a historic island in the Venetian Lagoon

== See also ==
- Espiritu Santo (disambiguation)
- Espírito Santo (disambiguation)
- Sancti Spiritus (disambiguation)
- Santo Espírito, Vila do Porto, Azores
