= Espiritu Santo (disambiguation) =

Espiritu Santo is the largest island in the nation of Vanuatu.

Espíritu Santo (Spanish, 'Holy Spirit') may also refer to:

== Places ==
- Isla Espíritu Santo, a Mexican island in the Gulf of California
- Espiritu Santo Island (Panama), Pearl Islands, Panama
- Espíritu Santo (fort), a former Spanish fortress in the Bio-Bio Region of Chile
- Espiritu Santo Airport, Espiritu Santo, Usulután Department, El Salvador
- Espiritu Santo Bay, Texas, U.S.
- Espíritu Santo Cape, on the border between Chile and Argentina
- Espíritu Santo River, Bolivia
- Espíritu Santo (volcano), on the border between Chile and Argentina
- Espíritu Santo, Riópar, a church in Riópar, Castilla-La Mancha, Spain
- Coatzacoalcos, formerly Espíritu Santo, Mexico
- Naval Advance Base Espiritu Santo, a World War II American naval in the New Hebrides, now Vanuatu

== Other uses ==
- C.D. Espíritu Santo, a Salvadoran professional football club
- Espíritu Santo antelope squirrel, a rodent endemic to Mexico
- Universidad de Especialidades Espíritu Santo, Guayaquil, Ecuador
- flor del Espiritu Santo, common name, in Spanish, of the orchid Peristeria elata

== See also ==
- Espírito Santo (disambiguation)
- Holy Spirit (disambiguation)
- Sancti Spiritus (disambiguation)
- Santo Spirito (disambiguation)
