= Holy Spirit Hospital (Frombork) =

Medieval hospital in Frombork

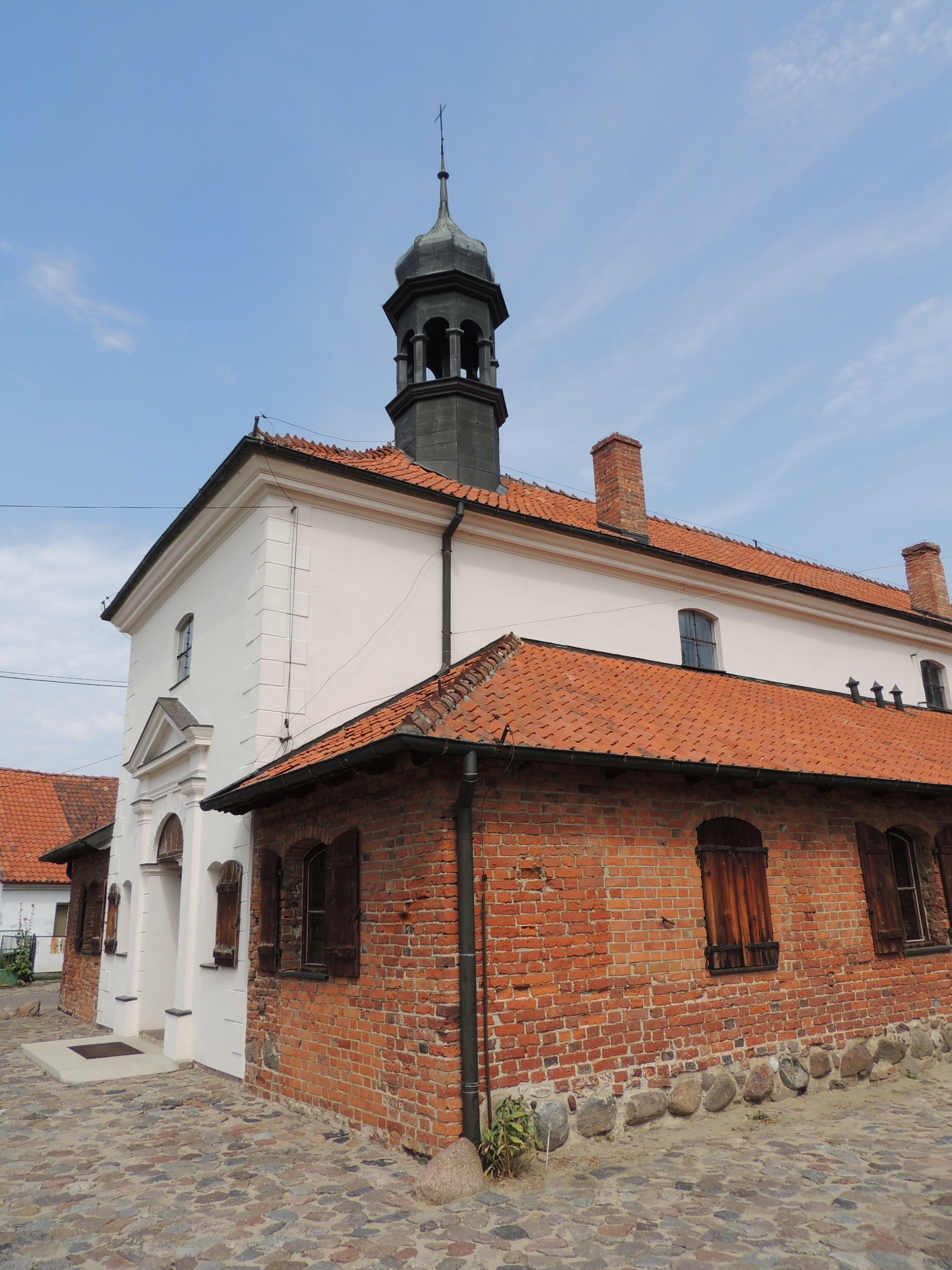
- Interactive map of the Holy Spirit Hospital area
- Alternative names: Museum of the History of Medicine

General information
- Location: Stara Street, Frombork, Poland
- Year built: 15th century

The Holy Spirit Hospital is a 15th century hospital in Frombork, Poland. It is a protected monument and currently houses the Department of the History of Medicine of the Nicolaus Copernicus Museum in Frombork.

== Name ==
According to Fielding Hudson Garrison, the tradition of dedicating hospitals to the Holy Spirit began with the Ospedale di Santo Spirito in Sassia in 1204. Rudolf Virchow lists 155 hospitals named for the Holy Spirit (heiliggeistspitäler) throughout medieval German-speaking lands.

== History ==
The hospital dates to the first half of the 15th century in what was then Teutonic and then Polish Prussian lands. In 1507, bishop Lucas Watzenrode transferred the property to the Antonites who managed the hospital until 1519. Nicholas Copernicus, who had personally witnessed the 1507 transfer, permanently moved to Frombork in 1510 and likely treated patients at the hospital. Copernicus had received medical training at the University of Padua, but his practice likely constituted of mostly herbal and non-surgical remedies. An herbal garden currently exists at the hospital in the modern period.

The hospital saw multiple renovations in the 17th and 18th centuries. By 1837, local priests were still listed as managers of a Holy Spirit Hospital in Frombork. The hospital building was destroyed during World War II, and renovations occurred in the 1970s, after which the structure became a museum.

== Complex ==
The structure is of brick and plaster. An adjacent chapel for St. Anne contains a 15th century fresco. A 2022 inventory of the herb garden found Origanum vulgare, Melissa officinalis, Levisticum officinale, Lavandula angustifolia, Salvia officinalis, Hyssopus officinalis, and Rosmarinus officinalis.

== See also ==
- Medieval medicine
- Medieval hospitals
