= Sisters of the Holy Ghost (Dubuque) =

The Sisters of the Holy Ghost of Dubuque were a Roman Catholic order of nuns.

The congregation was founded in 1890, by the Archbishop of Dubuque John Hennessey, its objectives being the cultivation of devotion to God the Holy Ghost and the education of youth. The mother-house was in St. Anthony's parish, West Dubuque, Iowa.
