= Espírito Santo, Rio Grande do Sul =

Neighbourhood in Porto Alegre, Brazil

Espírito Santo (literally Holy Spirit in English) is a neighbourhood (bairro) in the city of Porto Alegre, the state capital of Rio Grande do Sul, in Brazil. It was created by Law 6704 from November 19, 1990.

According to the last census in 2000, it occupies 174 hectares and has a population of around 6,000 people.
