= Holy Ghost Seminary =

Coordinates: 42°15′14″N 83°40′39″W

Holy Ghost Seminary was a Catholic seminary in Ypsilanti, Michigan, run by the Congregation of the Holy Spirit.

The seminary was opened because the closest Holy Ghost location, in Philadelphia, had a waiting list of potential students. Since Detroit had a large Catholic population, the order chose Ypsilanti as the site for their new seminary: "Rather than send students to Philadelphia, we decided to build a school in Michigan," recalls Fr Egbert Figaro, former assistant principal of the Holy Ghost seminary.
