= Frauenburg (castle) =

Castle in Styria, Austria

Coordinates: 47.205°N 14.437°E

- Styria, Austria
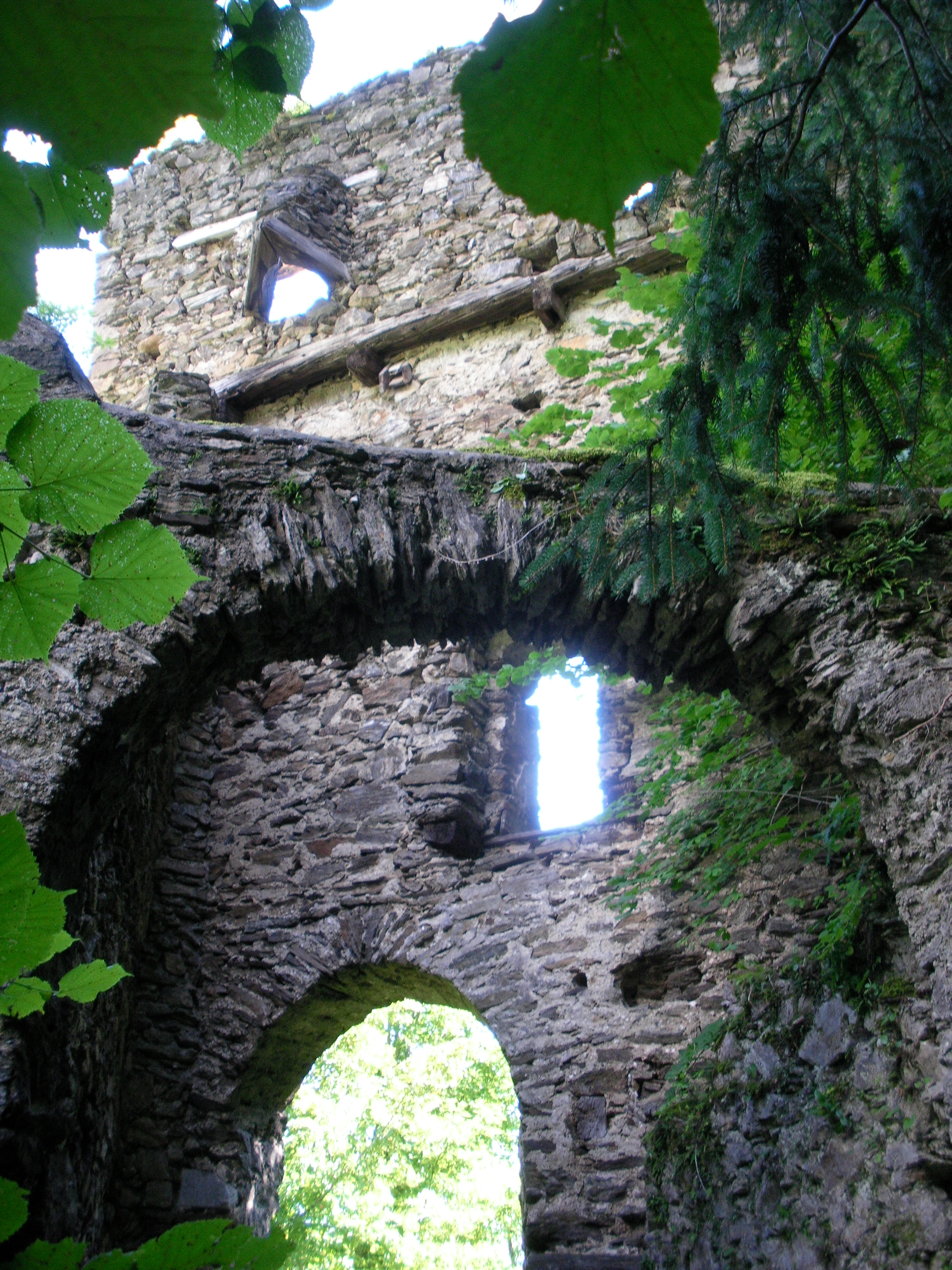

Site information
- Type: Spur castle

Site history
- Built: 13th century
- Built by: Ulrich von Liechtenstein

Frauenburg is a castle in the Mur Valley in Styria, Austria.

== See also ==
- List of castles in Austria
