= Santo Spirito dei Napoletani =

- Church of the Holy Spirit of the Neapolitans
- Chiesa dello Spirito Santo dei Napoletani
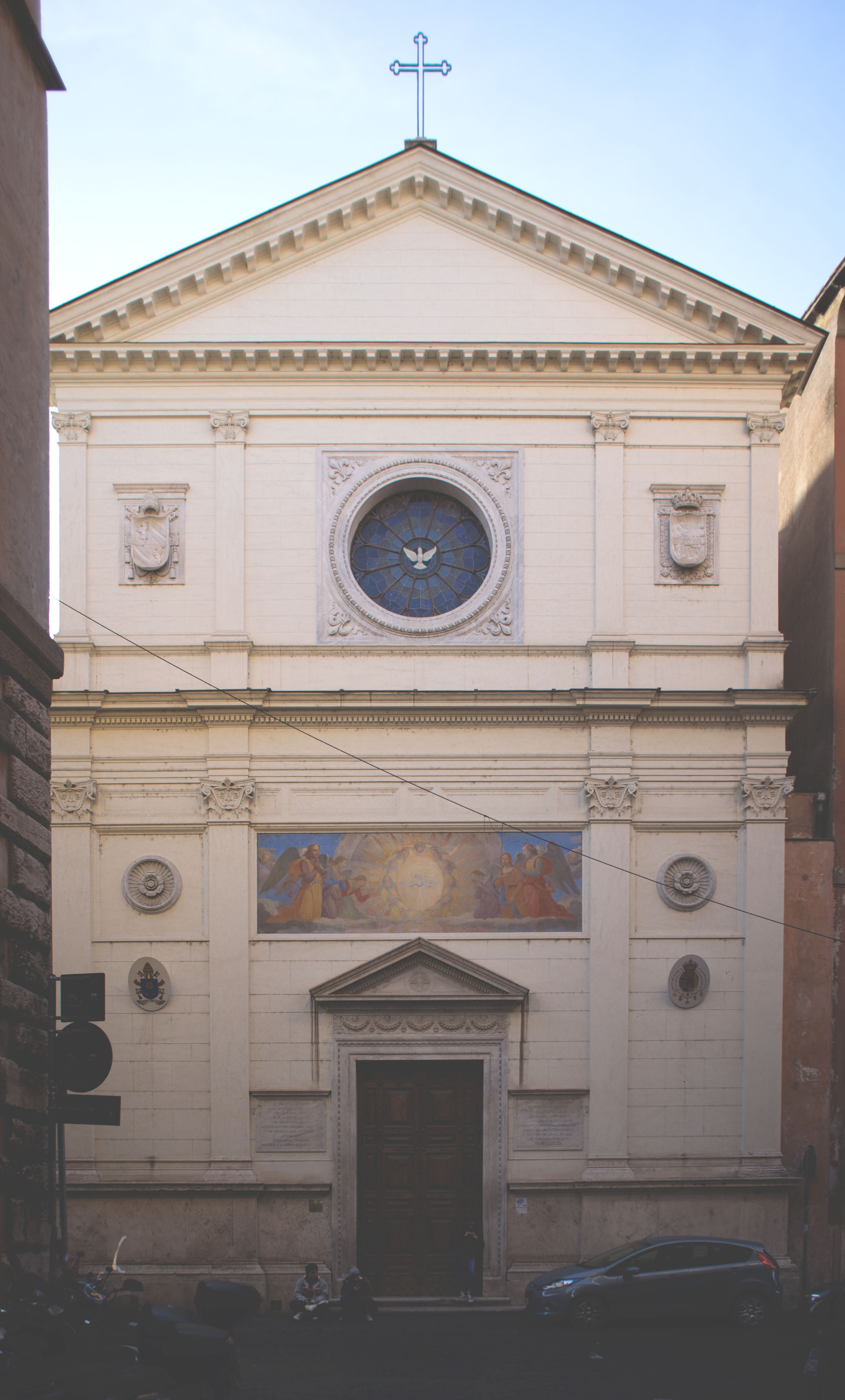
- Click on the map for a fullscreen view
- 41°53′47″N 12°28′04″E
- Location: Via Giulia 34, Regola, Rome
- Country: Italy
- Language: Italian
- Denomination: Catholic
- Tradition: Roman Rite

History
- Status: regional church
- Dedication: Holy Spirit

Architecture
- Functional status: active
- Architect: Carlo Fontana
- Architectural type: Rococo
- Completed: 1619

Administration
- Diocese: Rome

Santo Spirito dei Napoletani is a Roman Catholic church on via Giulia, in the Regola rione of Rome. It was the national church of the Kingdom of the Two Sicilies and is now the regional church for Campania.

== History ==
In Pope Pius V's catalogue of churches, this church is known as 'S. Aura in strada Iulia' (Saint Aurea in the via Julia) and was then part of a monastery. It was dedicated to Saint Aurea, a martyr from Ostia. In the 14th century it was also known as 'Sant'Eusterio', as a result of the catalogue of Cencio Camerario (n. 232) and of the anonymous Turin catalogue, which states "Ecclesia s. Austerii de campo Senensi habet unum sacerdotem" (the church of s. Austerii in campo Senensi has one priest). By 1572 the church was in a poor state - that year, it and the monastery were assigned to the Confraternity of the Holy Spirit of the Neapolitans. The Confraternity demolished the existing church and built a new one dedicated to the Holy Spirit, which was inaugurated in 1574.

The church was rebuilt twice more, to designs by Domenico Fontana or perhaps Ottaviano Mascherino at the end of the 16th century. At the beginning of the 18th century, it was given a major redesign by Carlo Fontana. Antonio Cipolla carried out major restorations to the interior and rebuilt the facade in 1853.

It was the burial place of Francis II of the Two Sicilies, his wife Maria Sophie and their three-month-old only daughter Cristina. It was also the national church for the Kingdom of the Two Sicilies from 1934 until 1984, when the three royal burials were transferred to Santa Chiara in Naples. The church was closed for thirty years due to water leaks and its abandoned state, but was restored in the 1980s and reopened for worship in 1986.

== Description ==
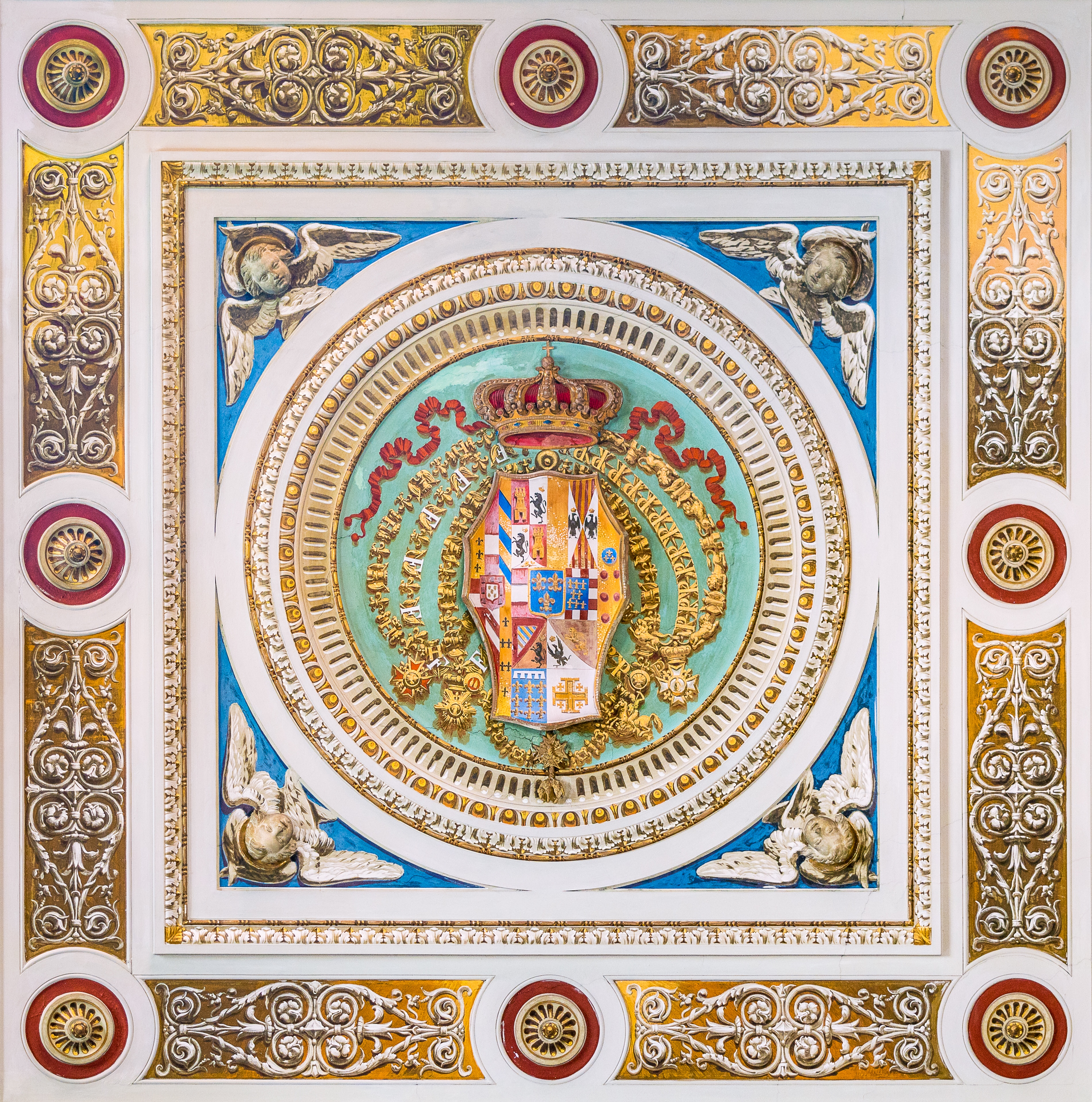
Detail of the church ceiling, showing the arms of the Royal House of Bourbon-Two Sicilies.

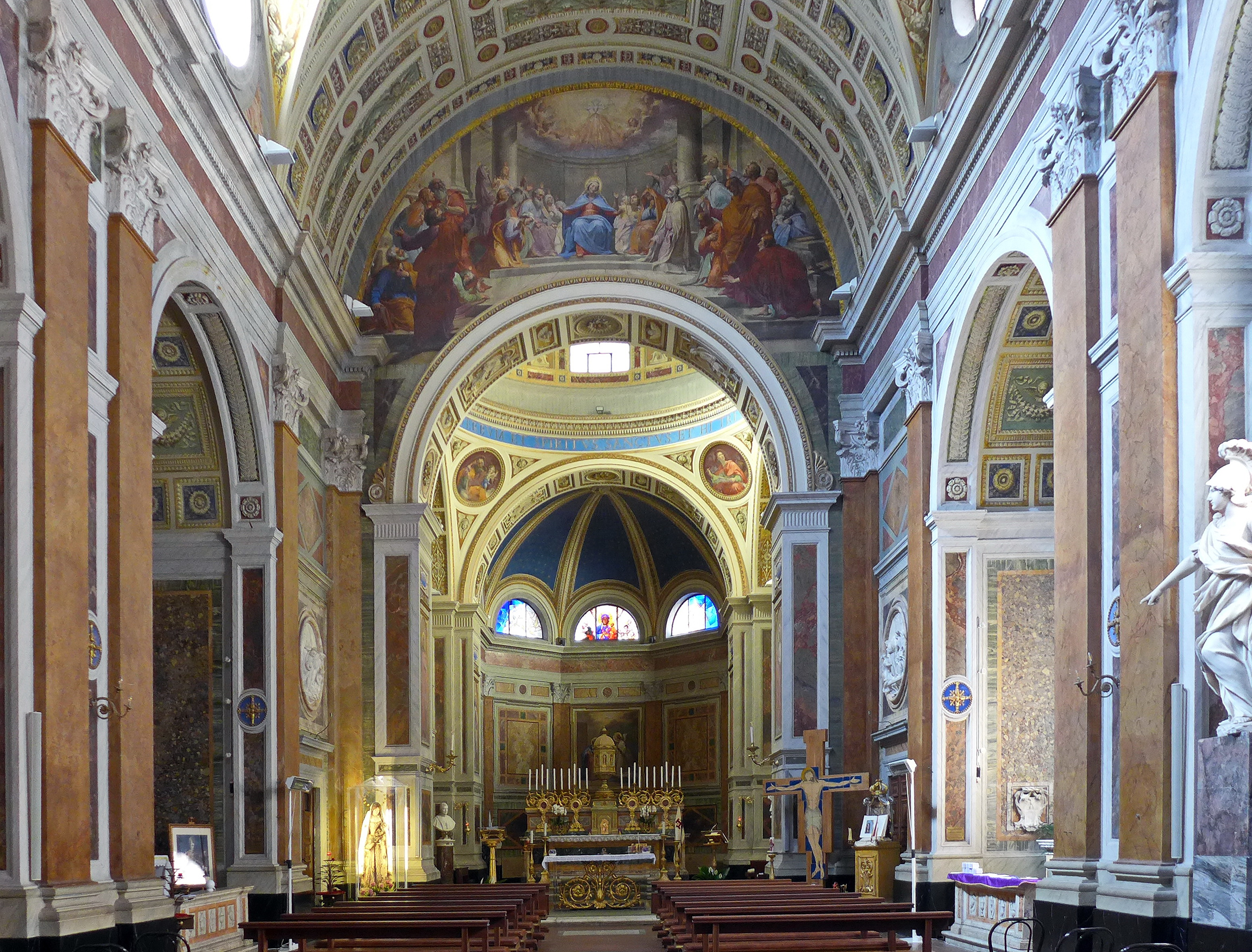
Interior of the church

== Sources ==
- Mariano Armellini, Le chiese di Roma dal secolo IV al XIX, Roma 1891
- Christian Hulsen, Le chiese di Roma nel Medio Evo, Firenze 1927
- F. Titi, Descrizione delle Pitture, Sculture e Architetture esposte in Roma, Roma 1763

== Bibliography ==
- P. Di Giammaria, Spirito Santo dei Napoletani, Fratelli Palombi Editori, Roma 1999
- C. Rendina, Le Chiese di Roma, Newton & Compton Editori, Milano 2000
- M. Quercioli, Rione VII Regola, in AA.VV, I rioni di Roma, Newton & Compton Editori, Milano 2000, Vol. II, pp. 448–498
