= Pichler =

Pichler is a German surname. Notable people with the surname include:

- Alfred Pichler (1913–1992), Roman Catholic priest and bishop
- Aloys Pichler (1833–1874), German librarian, Roman Catholic priest and theologian
- Anita Pichler (1948–1997), Italian writer and translator
- Anton Pichler (footballer) (born 1955)
- Anton Pichler (1697–1779), German-Italian gemcutter
- Benedikt Pichler (born 1997), Austrian footballer
- Berta Pichler, Austrian luger
- Bernd Pichler (born 1969), German biomedical engineer
- Caroline Pichler (1769–1843), Austrian historical novelist
- Christian Pichler (born 1988), Austrian short track speed skater
- David Pichler, multiple people
- Gabriela Pichler (born 1980), Swedish film director and screenwriter
- Giorgio Pichler, Italian luger
- Giovanni Pichler (1734–1791), German-Italian gemcutter
- Günter Pichler (1940–2026), Austrian violinist, teacher and conductor
- Hannes Pichler, Italian luger
- Hannes Pichler (physicist), Italian physicist
- Hans Pichler, multiple people
- Harald Pichler (born 1987), Austrian footballer
- Helga Pichler, Italian luger
- Imre Pichler (1947–2014), Hungarian teacher and politician
- Johann Pichler (1912–1995), German military pilot
- Johann Peter Pichler (1765–1807), Austrian engraver
- Johannes W. Pichler (born 1947), Austrian professor of law
- Joseph Pichler, multiple people
- Karl Pichler (born 1937), Austrian bobsledder
- Karoline Pichler (1769–1843), Austrian novelist
- Kurt Pichler (1898–1947), Swiss footballer
- Leopold Pichler (born 1942), Austrian weightlifter
- Luigi Pichler (1773–1854), German-Italian gemcutter
- Ralph Pichler (born 1954), Swiss bobsledder
- Roman Pichler, multiple people
- Rudolf Pichler (1930–2011), Austrian footballer
- Sascha Pichler (born 1986), Austrian footballer
- Shakir Pichler (born 1967), australian musician
- Stefan Pichler (born 1957), German CEO of global airline and tourism
- Thomas Pichler, Australian artistic gymnast
- Vitus Pichler (1670–1736), Austrian writer
- Walter Pichler, multiple people
- Wilhelm Pichler (1908–?), Austrian rower
- Wolfgang Pichler (born 1955), German biathlete

== See also ==
- Pichl (disambiguation)
- Pickler (disambiguation)
