= Pickles (surname) =

Pickles is a surname. Notable people with the surname include:

- Albert Pickles (1877–1958), English football player and manager
- Christina Pickles (born 1935), British-born American actress
- Christopher Pickles (born 1966), English cricketer
- David Pickles (1935–2020), English cricketer
- Eric Pickles (born 1952), British politician
- James Pickles (1925–2010), British judge and newspaper columnist
- Lewis Pickles (1932-2021), English cricketer
- Vivian Pickles (born 1931), English actress
- Wilfred Pickles (1904–1978), English actor and radio presenter
- William Pickles (doctor) (1885–1962), English epidemiologist

== Fictional ==
- The Pickles family from Rugrats
- Mr. Pickles, the main protagonist of the show of the same name
- Farmer Percy Pickles, a character in Bob the Builder

== See also ==
- People section of;
  - Pickel (disambiguation)
  - Pickle (disambiguation)
