= Hans Pichler =

Hans Pichler may refer to:

- Hans Pichler (dental surgeon) (1877–1949)
- Hans Pichler (philosopher) (1882–1958)
