= Pickler =

Pickler is a surname. Notable people with the surname include:

- Bruna Pickler (born 1990), Brazilian athlete, actress, composer and sports reporter
- Diana Pickler (born 1983), American heptathlete
- Fred Pickler, American photographer
- Jeff Pickler (born 1976), American baseball coach
- John Pickler (1844–1910), American politician
- Kellie Pickler (born 1986), American singer, songwriter, and television personality
- Nedra Pickler (born 1975), American political journalist

== Other ==
- Pickler, one who does pickling
- Pickler, a person who performs pickling (metal), removing impurities from a metal surface using acid
- Pickler (pickleball), a person that plays pickleball

== See also ==
- Pichler
- Pickle (disambiguation)
