= Fort Fisher Visitor Center =

Visitor center in North Carolina, United States

- Interactive map of Fort Fisher Visitor Center
- Location: New Hanover County, North Carolina, United States
- Coordinates: 33.9720°N 77.9174°W
- Area: 20,000 square feet
- Website: historicsites.nc.gov/all-sites/fort-fisher/plan-your-visit

The Fort Fisher Visitor Center is a visitor center located in the Forth Fisher State Recreation Area in New Hanover County, North Carolina, United States. It features interactive exhibits that tells the story and history of Fort Fisher and the surrounding area.

== History ==
Fort Fisher protected the port of Wilmington, the last remaining supply line for Robert E. Lee's Army of Northern Virginia, during the American Civil War. It fell to Union forces in January 1865.

The original visitor center was built in 1965 and designed to accommodate approximately 25,000 visitors annually. By the mid-2000s, the historic fort was attracting approximately 600,000 visitors annually.

In November 2022, following more than a decade of planning and fundraising, the construction began on a new 20,000-square-foot visitor center designed by the American architecture firm Clark Nexsen. The $21 million project included a building three ttimes the size of the original visitor center.

The project was initially expected to be completed in "mid- to late May 2024," but it opened on October 30, 2024. The facility was originally projected to serve more than one million visitors annually.

In November 2025, the visitor center received the North Carolina Visitor Attraction of the Year award from the North Carolina Travel Industry Association (NCTIA).
