= Sea pickle =

Sea pickle is a common name for several plants and animals and may refer to:

== Plants ==
- Salicornia species, especially:
  - Salicornia europaea, native to Europe
  - Salicornia virginica, native to North America
- Sesuvium portulacastrum

== Animals ==
- Pyrosome, cone-shaped colonies that inhabit the upper layers of the open ocean

== See also ==
- Samphire
- Pickle (disambiguation)
- Sea (disambiguation)
- Sea cucumber
