= Pickle =

Pickle, pickled or Pickles may refer to:

== Food ==
- Pickle, a food that has undergone pickling
- Pickled cucumber
- Pickle, a sweet, vinegary pickled chutney popular in Britain, such as Branston Pickle, also known as "sweet pickle" or "ploughman's pickle"
- South Asian pickle, also known as achar, savory condiments popular in South Asia

== People ==
- Alastair Ruadh MacDonnell or "Pickle" (1725–1761), Scottish Jacobite and British spy
- Marc-Édouard Vlasic or "Pickles" (born 1987), American ice hockey player
- Pickles Dillhoefer (1893–1922), American baseball player
- Pickles Douglas (1886–1954), English cricketer and boxing referee
- George W. Pickle (1845–1912), American politician from Tennessee
- J. J. Pickle (1913–2005), American politician from Texas
- William Pickle, American Sergeant at Arms
- Alonzo H. Pickle (1843–?), Canadian-American soldier

== Dogs ==
- Pickles (dog) (died 1967), which found the stolen World Cup trophy in 1966
- Pickles (pickleball), a dog often cited as the name origin for the sport of pickleball
- Mr. Pickles, the titular demonic dog in an American animated sitcom

== Entertainment ==
- "Pickle Rick", an episode of Rick and Morty
- The Pickle, a 1993 film
- "The Pickle Song", an alternative title for "The Motorcycle Song" by Arlo Guthrie, appearing on Alice's Restaurant (1967) and The Best of Arlo Guthrie (1977), among others
- "Pickles", a SpongeBob SquarePants season 1 episode
- Pickles (comic strip), by Brian Crane
- Pickle (comics), a comics series by Dylan Horrocks

== Fictional characters ==
- Pickles (Dethklok), a drummer of Dethklok in Metalocalypse
- The Pickles, a family in Cloudstreet
- Pickles, a character from The Dick Van Dyke Show
- Pickles, a toy bunny from Doc McStuffins
- Pickles B.L.T, a character from the Lalaloopsy toy line
- Pickle, a character from Baki the Grappler
- Pickles Oblong, a character from The Oblongs

== Places ==
- Pickles Creek, a stream in South Dakota
- Pickles Reef, a coral reef in Florida

== Software and commerce ==
- Pickle (app), a crowdsourced job app
- Pickle (Python), a serialization computer library module
- Pickle (company), an American peer-to-peer fashion rental and resale marketplace

== Sports and Games ==
- Pickleball, a racket sport
  - Pickle or Pickled, losing a game of pickleball without scoring a single point
- Pickle-in-the-middle, a three-person game
- Rundown or pickle, in baseball

== Other uses ==
- HMS Pickle, various ships of the British Royal Navy
- University Tower (Durham, North Carolina), known as "The Pickle"

== See also ==
- Pickel (disambiguation)
- Pickler (disambiguation)
- Pickling (metal), a metal surface treatment
- Serialization, also called pickling in computing
- List of pickled foods
