= Pichl =

Pichl may refer to:

- Pichl (surname), a Czech surname
- Pichl bei Wels, a municipality in the district of Wels-Land, Upper Austria
- Pichl-Preunegg, a municipality in the Liezen, Austria
- Pichl-Kainisch, a village in the Salzkammergut, Liezen, Austria
- (Außer- and Inner-) Pichl, village(s) in the municipality of Gsies, South Tyrol

== See also ==
- Pichler, a surname
