= Pfaffenhofen an der Ilm =

Pfaffenhofen a.d.Ilm
- Town
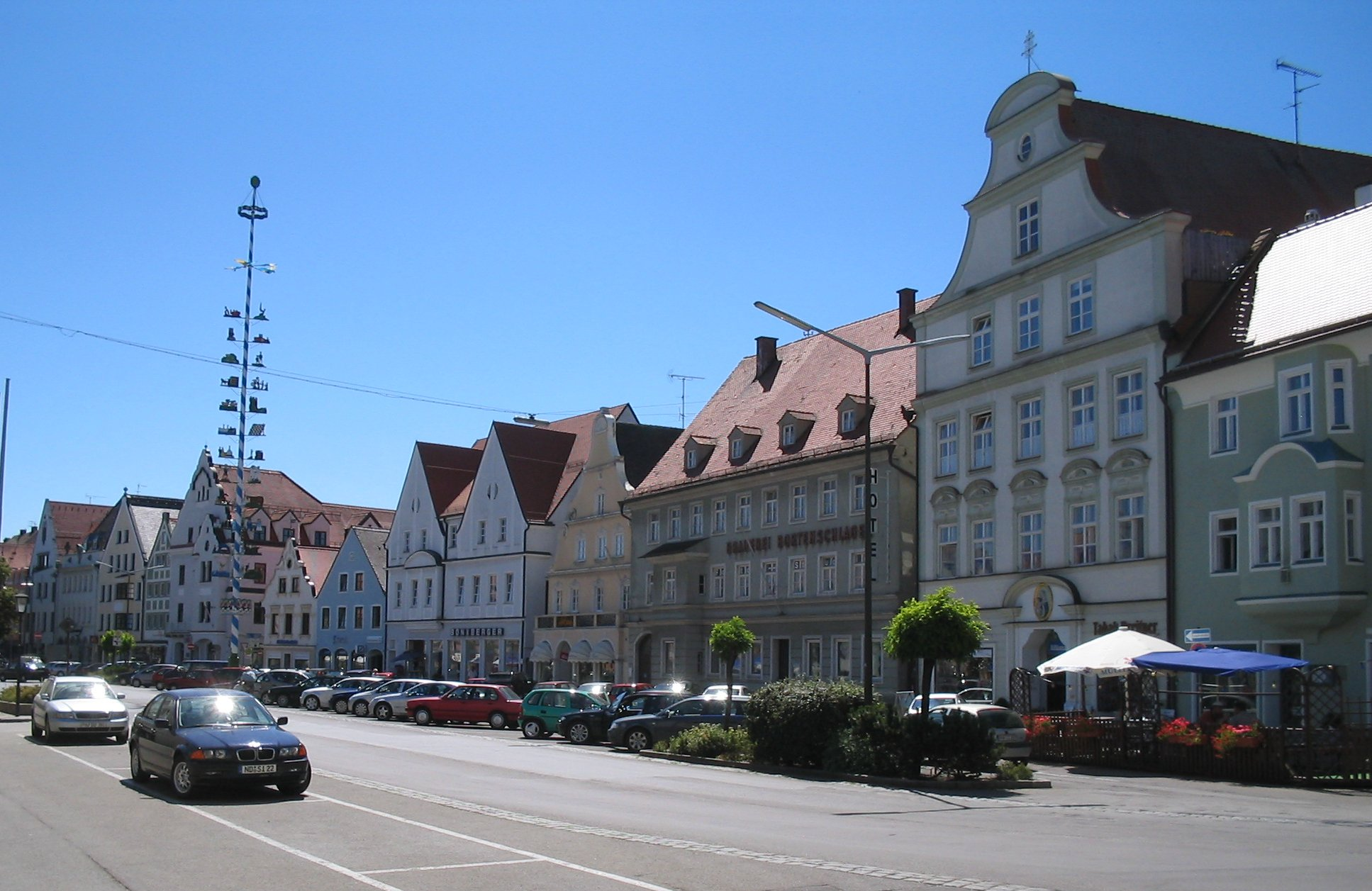
- Town square

- Coat of arms

- Location of Pfaffenhofen a.d.Ilm within Pfaffenhofen a.d.Ilm district
- Interactive map of Pfaffenhofen a.d.Ilm
- Location within Germany Location within Bavaria
- Coordinates: 48°32′N 11°31′E
- Country: Germany
- State: Bavaria
- Admin. region: Oberbayern
- District: Pfaffenhofen a.d.Ilm

Government
  - Mayor (2020–26): Thomas Herker (SPD)

Area
  - Total: 92.64 km^{2} (35.77 sq mi)
- Elevation: 428 m (1,404 ft)

Population (2025-12-31)
  - Total: 27,228
  - Density: 293.9/km^{2} (761.2/sq mi)
- Time zone: UTC+01:00 (CET)
  - Summer (DST): UTC+02:00 (CEST)
- Postal codes: 85276
- Dialling codes: 08441
- Vehicle registration: PAF
- Website: www.pfaffenhofen.de

Pfaffenhofen an der Ilm (German pronunciation: [pfafn̩ˈhoːfn̩ ʔan deːɐ̯ ˈʔɪlm], lit. 'Pfaffenhofen on the Ilm'; Central Bavarian: Pfahofa an da Uim) is a municipality in Bavaria, Germany, capital of the district Pfaffenhofen. It is located on the river Ilm, and had a population of 23,282 in 2004.

As of a press release in October 2011 from the UN-backed annual International Awards for Liveable Communities (LivCom), Pfaffenhofen an der Ilm was saluted by judges for the quality of its environmental best practice. The Bavarian town of 23,000 people was also named the most liveable city with a population between 20,000-75,000. The elite group of cities fulfilled the awards’ range of key criteria involving environmental best practice, healthy lifestyle of citizens, community involvement as well as arts and cultural heritage.

== History ==
Evidence of Bronze Age settlements have been found in Pfaffenhofen, with burial mounds found in forest areas north of the town.

Historians believe that monks from Ilmmünster Abbey built the Pfaffenhöfe near Altenstadt in the north of the city, in the 8th century.

The oldest seal of Pfaffenhofen dates back to 1333. In 1388, Pfaffenhofen, together with its church and castle, was destroyed during the War of the Cities.

In 1745 it was the site of the Battle of Pfaffenhofen during the War of the Austrian Succession

In 2017, the horticultural show 'Nature in Pfaffenhofen' consisted of 89 days of events, which attracted 330,000 visitors.

== Sport ==
=== Ice Hockey ===
The ice stadium is home to the EC Pfaffenhofen IceHogs. The team plays in the Bavarian Ice Hockey League and reached the Bavarian runner-up in the 2004/05 season and the 2007/08 season.

=== Swimming ===
The municipal outdoor pool 'Ilmbad' and the indoor 'Gerolsbad', are swimming facilities in the town.

=== Sports park ===
As part of the 2017 'Nature in Pfaffenhofen', a modern sports park with training grounds, stadium, fitness equipment and beach volleyball fields was built near the city center on the Ilm near the ice stadium.

=== Speedway ===
The motorcycle speedway track run by the club MSC Pfaffenhofen was demolished to make way for the sports park. It had existed from 17 September 1950 to 4 May 2014 and hosted important events, including a qualifying round of the Speedway World Championship in 1987 and the final of the 1992 Speedway Under-21 World Championship.

== Notable people ==
- Hans Demmelmeier (1887–1953), politician
- Michael Hefele (born 1990), professional football player
- Joseph Maria Lutz (1893–1972), writer and poet
- Bernd Pichler (born 1969), electrical engineer and professor
- Christoph Ruckhäberle (born 1972), painter
- Anton Thumann (1912–1946), SS Obersturmführer in various concentration camps
- Marius Zug (born 2003), racing driver

== See also ==
- Stadtbus Pfaffenhofen
- Holy Spirit (Pfaffenhofen an der Ilm)
