= Holy Spirit (Pfaffenhofen an der Ilm) =

Church building in Bavaria, Germany

Coordinates: 48°31′49″N 11°30′19″E

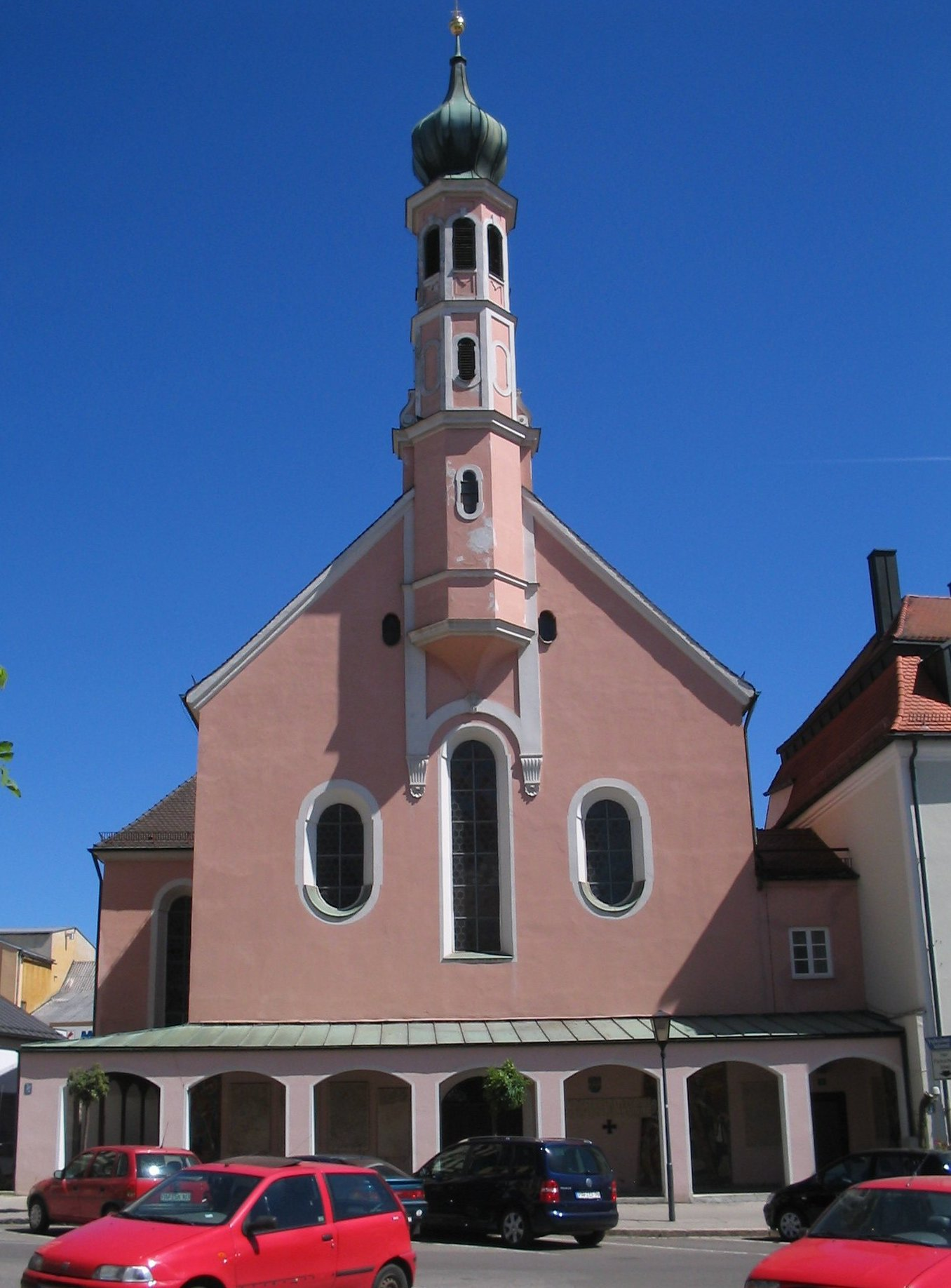
South façade of the church

Interior of the church

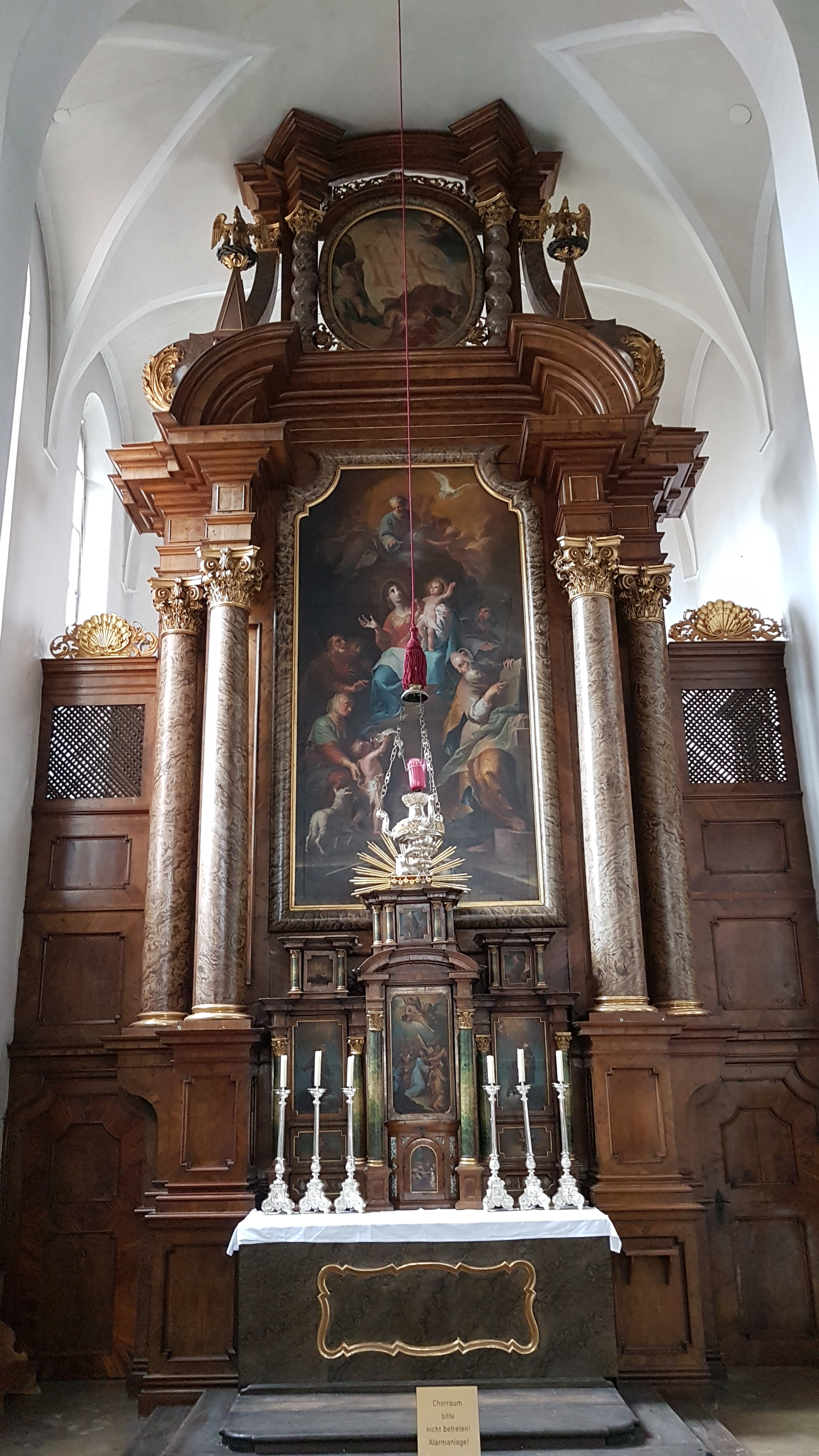
High altarpiece

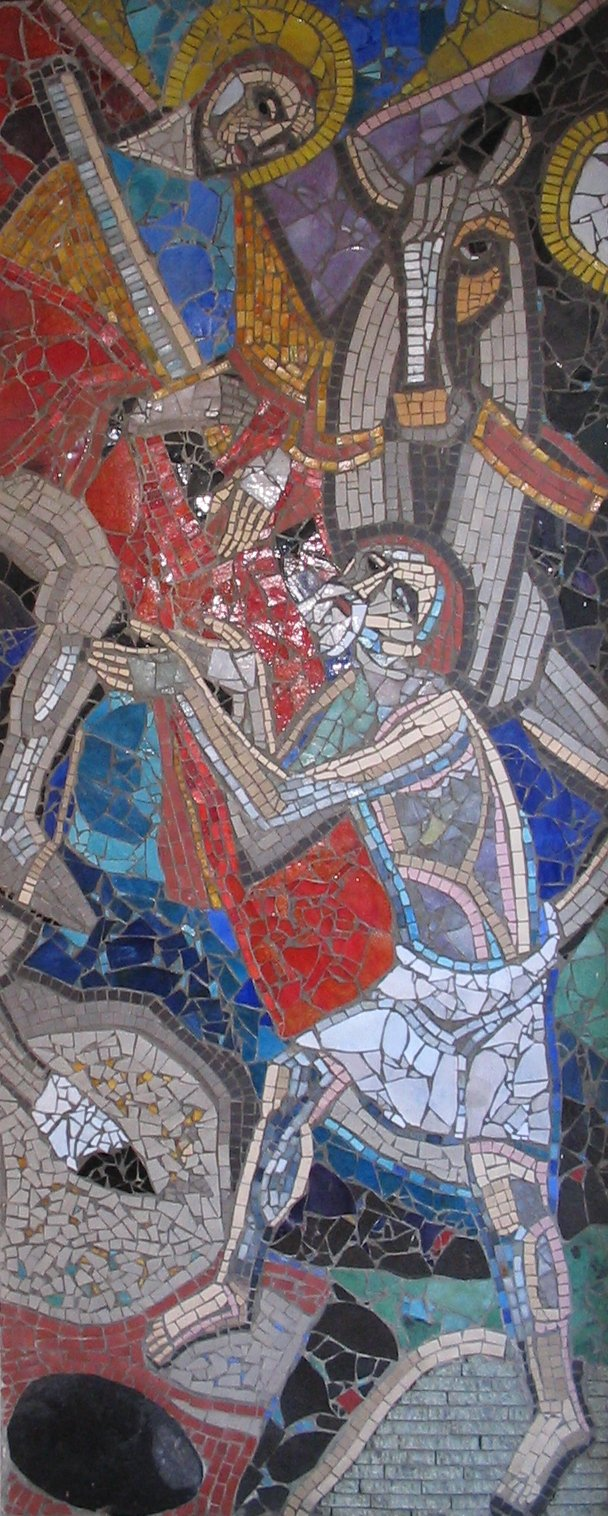
Mosaic on the war memorial

The hospital-church (Spitalkirche) Holy Spirit in Pfaffenhofen an der Ilm is the church and hospice of the erstwhile Franciscan Monks. It is located near the upper side of the main square, opposite the parish church of St John the Baptist.

== History ==
In 1703 the Franciscans built a hospice on the upper side of the main square in Pfaffenhofen. The monastery and church was built between 1716 and 1719 in the baroque style by an unknown architect. Below the choir of the church is a crypt, which was used to store grain and ammunition during the Coalition Wars. The monastery was dissolved in 1802 as part of the secularisation of Bavaria. The town of Pfaffenhofen acquired the site and set up the municipal hospital, which had previously stood on the site of the present-day town hall. The church served as a place of worship for the patients of the hospital. In 1900 the derelict north tower was demolished and a new tower was erected on the south façade, in accordance with Johann Baptist Schott's architectural plans. In 1959 the arcade porch of the southern side of the building was built and in 1974 the church received a new organ.

Latterly the municipal building complex served as a retirement home until 1997, when this was shut down. The residents at the time were relocated to premises outside of the town centre, which were the site of the municipal hospital from 1862 to 1984. In 2015 the church was renovated for €725,000. During the eight-month construction period the roof truss was secured and a new coat of paint was applied to the façade. Today the church is used for worship, weddings and concerts. During Advent and Christmastime a magnificent nativity scene is displayed, some of whose figurines are more than 200 years old. The crib, which is altered many times between the first day of Advent and Candlemas, is part of the Pfaffenhofen Krippenweg.

== Description ==
The hospital church is a plastered aisleless church with a choir and side chapel on the western side. It is not - as was typical for buildings at the time - oriented towards the east; instead the choir is on the northern side. The nave and the choir gallery are vaulted with a barrel vault. On the southern front gable, there is a neo-Baroque, octagonal tower with an onion dome.

The majority of the church's furnishings date from the time the church was built. The altar panels of all of the four altars were created by the electoral court painter Johann Caspar Sing from Munich. The main altar painting depicts the Holy Kinship, Jesus Christ surrounded by his relatives. Up to the beginning of the 19th century, the interior of the church was also decorated by ceiling paintings by the famous artist, Cosmas Damian Asam. Today's ceiling frescoes are Michael P. Weingartner's work from 1952. They show various scenes of the life of Francis of Assisi. The church's Stations of the Cross date from 1862. The war memorial is situated under the archways that surround the church. The accompanying mosaics, like the ceiling paintings, are also by Michael P. Weingartner.

The former monastery buildings, in which a hospital and a retirement home were later located, are directly adjoined to the east side of the church. The double-layered, plastered mono-pitched roof originates, in part, from the 18th century.

== Literature ==
Jolanda Drexler-Herold, Angelika Wegener-Hüssen: Landkreis Pfaffenhofen a. d. Ilm (= Bavarian State Office for Monument Protection [publisher]: Denkmäler in Bayern. Vol. I.19). Karl M. Lipp Verlag, Munich 1992, ISBN 3-87490-570-5, p. 158.
