= Robert Harrill =

American hermit

- Robert Harrill outside his home
- Born: February 2, 1893; Shelby, North Carolina, US
- Died: June 4, 1972 (aged 79); Fort Fisher State Recreation Area, North Carolina, US
- Occupation: Hermit
- Spouse: Katie Hamrick
- Children: 5

Robert E. Harrill, or Harrell (February 2, 1893 – June 4, 1972), was an American man also known as the Fort Fisher Hermit. He became a hermit in 1955, at the age of 62, having hitchhiked to Fort Fisher on the North Carolina coast from Morganton, North Carolina. He had previously been committed to a mental hospital in Morganton, after his marriage failed. Harrill settled in an abandoned World War II bunker set in a salt marsh beside the Cape Fear River in the Fort Fisher State Recreation Area.

Harrill fed himself by fishing and scavenging. He and his bunker became a tourist attraction and visitors would listen to him talk about his "School of Common Sense", leaving donations in a frying pan. After living as a hermit for 17 years, he died under mysterious circumstances in 1972, with the official cause of death given as a heart attack. His life has been commemorated with books, films and a theatre production.

== Early life ==
Robert E. Harrill was born in Shelby, North Carolina on February 2, 1893. He was educated at Boiling Springs High School and then Gardner-Webb Jr. College. His parents were abusive, which led to him spending much of his time in the local woods. He married Katie Hamrick in 1913 and they had five children. The eldest son committed suicide and the family later fell apart in the 1930s due in part to Harrill's mental health problems. He was also known as Robert Harrell.

== Hermit ==
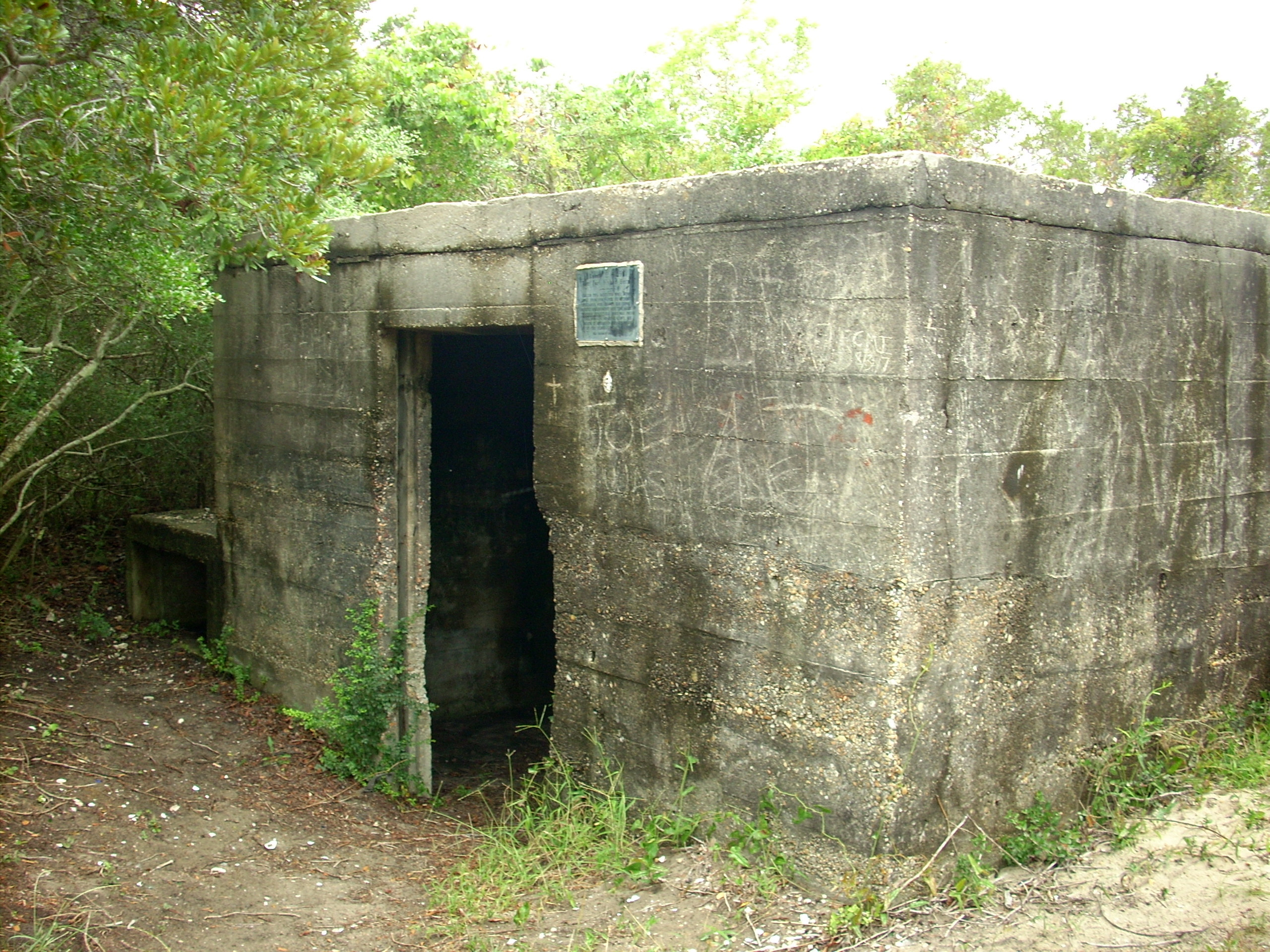
The hermit's bunker in October 2007

The name "Fort Fisher Hermit" came from Fort Fisher and the Fort Fisher State Recreation Area, where Harrill settled. He arrived in 1955, having left a mental institution in Morganton and then hitchhiking 260 miles (420 km) to the coast. At first Harrill lived in a tent near to the Confederate monument by the fort. He then squatted in an abandoned World War II era bunker set in a salt marsh beside the Cape Fear River. He collected driftwood to furnish his home and was able to gather much of the food that he needed from the marsh. He ate fish, clams and oysters, and planted a vegetable garden to supplement his diet. Harrill learned many of his survival skills from Empie Hewett, a true hermit, who also lived in the salt marshes of the Fort Fisher area. Harrill loved to talk to visitors (who left donations in a frying pan) and his guestbook recorded thousands of entries.

== Attraction ==
Robert Harrill became the second largest tourist attraction in the state of North Carolina, trailing only the USS North Carolina in terms of numbers of visitors. Visitors to Carolina Beach would routinely take time to call on the hermit, and he would talk about his philosophy, which he termed the "School of Common Sense". He told people who came to see him that he was writing a book entitled A Tyrant in Every Home. Alongside the curious, Harrill met drunk youths and developers who wanted to evict him; two men even kidnapped and robbed him. Once, after falling asleep on the beach, Harrill was arrested and charged with vagrancy, defending himself in court. Harrill also attracted a large number of journalists to his bunker interested to write about his lifestyle and beliefs. He explained his popularity in 1968:

Everybody ought to be a hermit for a few minutes to an hour or so every 24 hours, to study, meditate, and commune with their creator ... millions of people want to do just what I'm doing, but since it is much easier thought of than done, they subconsciously elect me to represent them, that's why I'm successful ...

— Robert Harrill, New Hanover Sun.

== Death ==
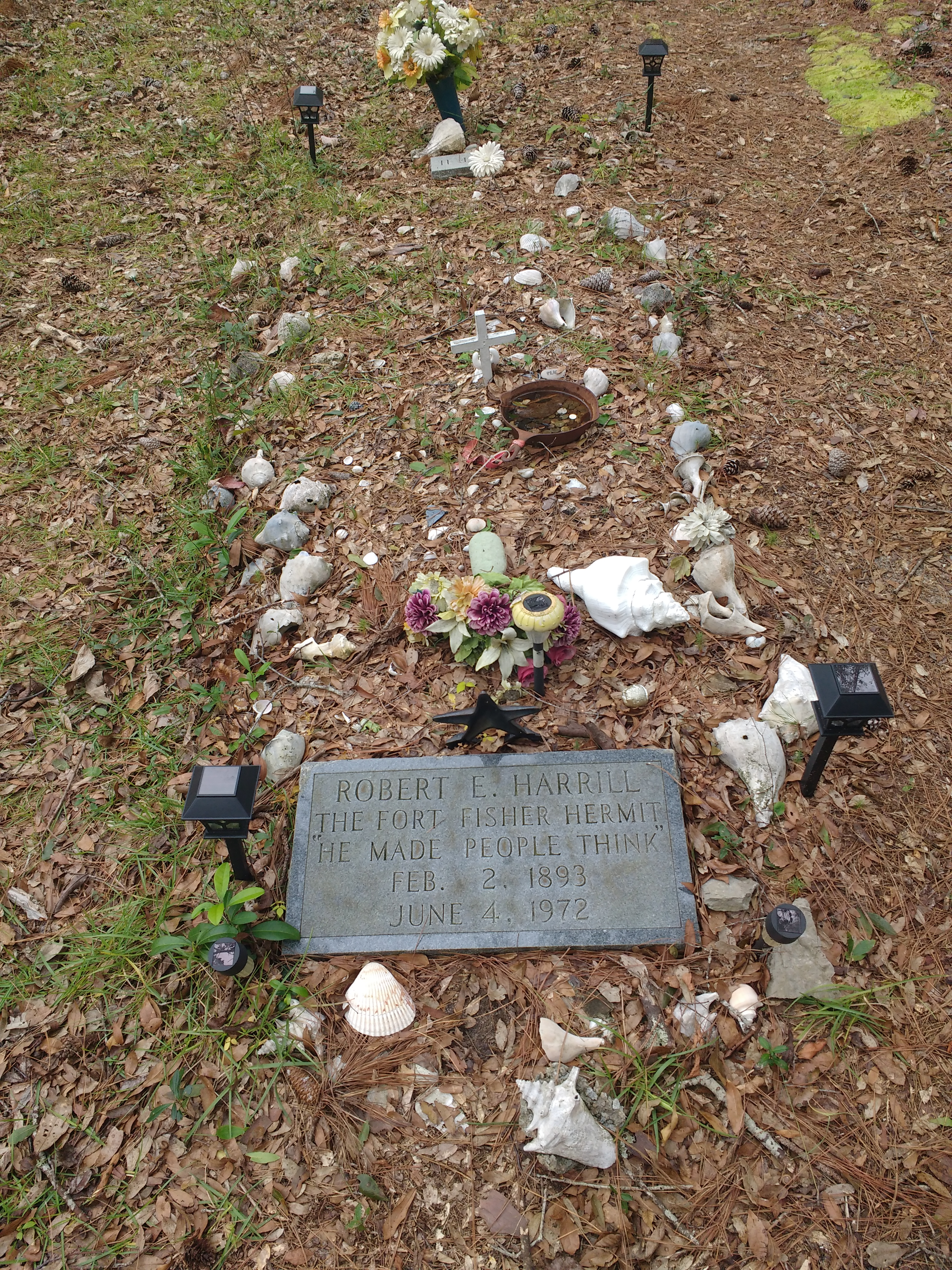
Harrill's grave is located at the Federal Point Cemetery. The headstone states "He made people think".

After living as a hermit for 17 years, Harrill died under mysterious circumstances on June 4, 1972. The New Hanover County coroner pronounced the cause of death as a heart attack, yet local rumours suggested Harrill may have been killed after a violent attack by a group of three men, a fisherman alleging that he saw them speeding away in a car. However, there was no autopsy and the case was closed as a natural death. When Harrill's son agreed to a second autopsy in 1984, the body was exhumed but the test results were inconclusive. Harrill was first buried in a cemetery off River Road near Fort Fisher, and then later moved to the Federal Point Cemetery at Dow Road, Carolina Beach.

== Memorial and legacy ==
Harrill's life has been remembered with books, films and a theatre production. A documentary film called The Fort Fisher Hermit: The Life and Death of Robert E. Harrill was released in 2007. Fred Pickler knew Harrill and with Anne Russell co-authored the book Life and Times of the Fort Fisher Hermit, Through the Lens of Fred Pickler. A local theatre company produced The Hermit of Fort Fisher, written by David Wright. It premiered in July 2014 at the Cape Fear Playhouse and had a sold-out run.

The Hermit Society was founded to commemorate the life of Harrill; president Michael Edwards wrote The Battle for Independence: The Story of the Fort Fisher Hermit. The society gives out certificates to graduates of the "School of Common Sense". The bunker where Harrill lived is still standing and can be reached by following the Basin Trail at the Fort Fisher State Recreation Area. A plaque on the bunker commemorates his occupation.
