= Stadtbus Pfaffenhofen =

Bus operator in Bavaria, Germany

Stadtbus Pfaffenhofen is the local bus operator in the town of Pfaffenhofen an der Ilm in Bavaria, Germany. There are 8 routes ('Linie' in German) centred on a spine between the Railway Station (Bahnhof) and Hauptplatz. As with many bus services in Germany, Stadtbus Pfaffenhofen is owned by the local authority and runs in close co-operation with the German national rail operator Deutsche Bahn (DB)
