= Pichl (surname) =

Pichl (feminine: Pichlová) is a Czech surname. Notable people with the surname include:

- Alois Pichl (1782–1856), Austrian architect
- Václav Pichl (1741–1805), Czech composer

== See also ==
- Pichler, a German surname
- Irving Pichel (1891–1954), American actor and film director
