= Fort Fisher State Recreation Area =

State recreation area in North Carolina, United States

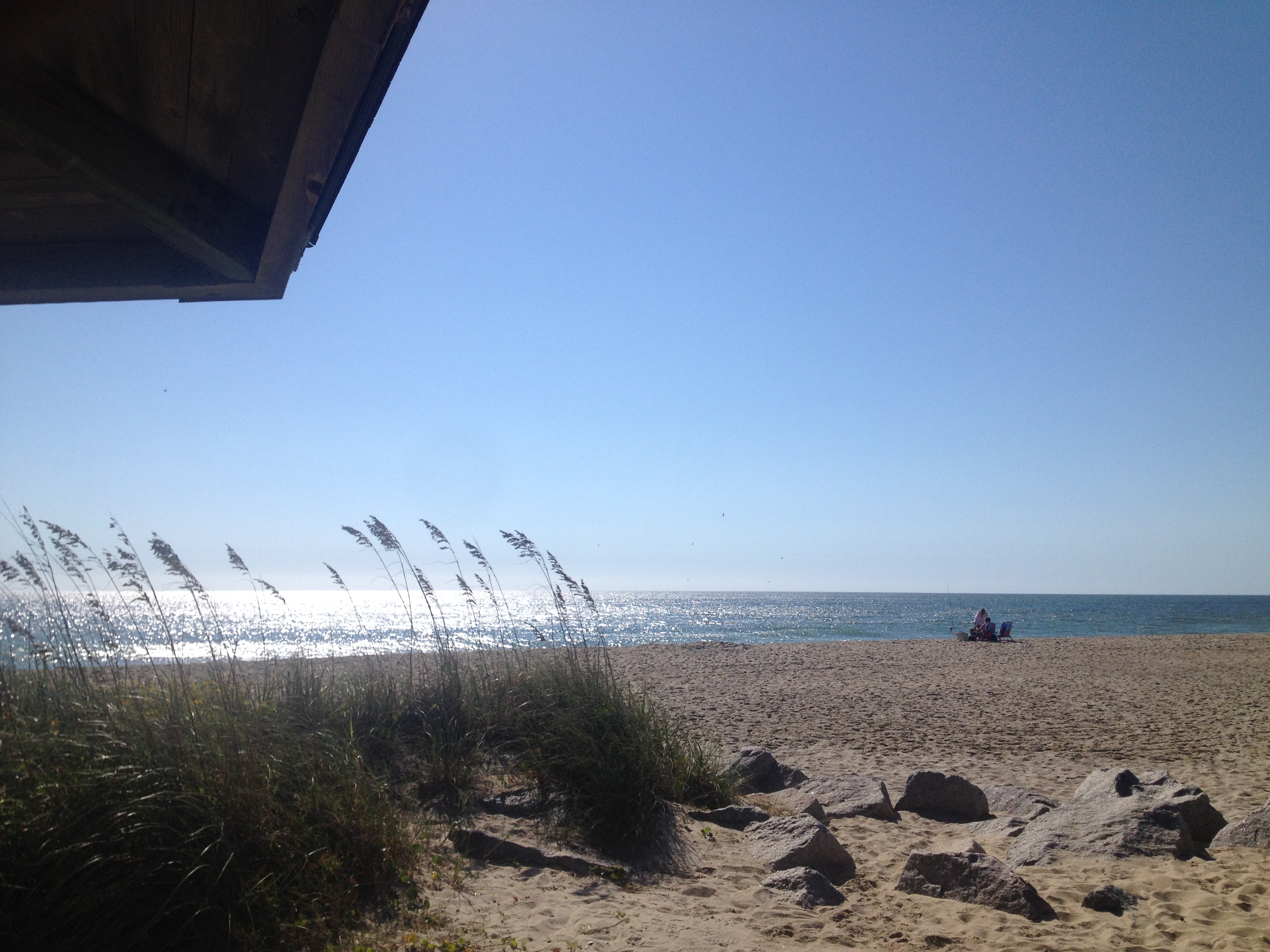
- Interactive map of Fort Fisher State Recreation Area
- Location: New Hanover County, North Carolina, United States
- Coordinates: 33°57′12″N 77°55′44″W
- Area: 287 acres (116 ha)
- Established: 1986
- Administrator: North Carolina Division of Parks and Recreation
- Website: Official website

Fort Fisher State Recreation Area is a 287-acre (116 ha) North Carolina state park in New Hanover County, North Carolina in the United States. Located near Kure Beach, North Carolina, it includes Fort Fisher, site of a major naval engagement during the American Civil War. The recreation area also served as a home for the Fort Fisher Hermit, Robert Harrill. Harrill lived in a bunker and shared his beliefs about "common sense" with thousands of visitors every year while surviving on what he could gather from the surrounding salt marsh and oyster beds.

Today, the recreation area consists of the remains of the earthen Fort Fisher and a museum at Fort Fisher State Historic Site, an oceanfront beach pavilion, a large lagoon popular with windsurfers, and a long stretch of beach that is accessible only by four-wheel drive vehicles. The beach is an important nesting ground for sea turtles (Loggerheads and some Green Sea turtles), and state park rangers regularly patrol the beach to identify recently built turtle nests. Once they are identified, they are clearly marked and surrounded with a mesh fence to prevent vehicles from driving over the eggs. The openings in the mesh are large enough to allow newly hatched turtles to pass through and return to the sea.

The endangered Piping Plover and the Peregrine Falcon are other endangered species found in the area.

== History ==
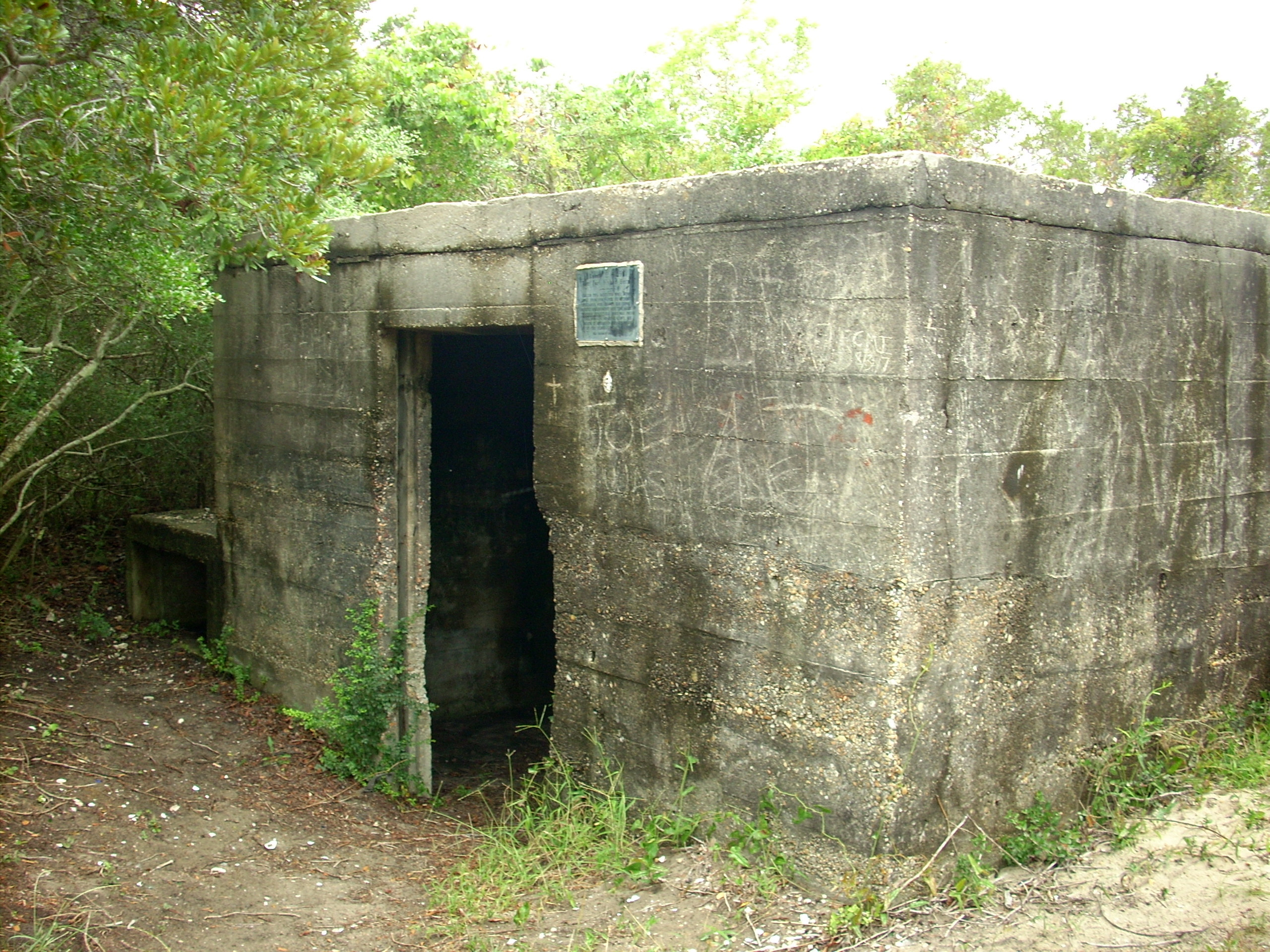
The Fort Fisher Hermit's bunker, October 2007

The city of Wilmington on the Cape Fear River was an important port of entry for the Confederacy during the Civil War. By late 1864, it was the last southern port open to trade. Fort Fisher, built in 1861, served to protect this valuable port from Union ships. In 1864, the first of two Union attacks on Fort Fisher took place. The fort held strong during the first battle and Union forces withdrew, but the Confederacy was not so fortunate the next time. The First Battle of Fort Fisher, during the American Civil War, was the largest naval bombardment and land-sea battle fought in any war up to that time.

In early 1865, a fleet of 56 ships bombarded the fort prior to a land assault by a force of more than 3,300 infantry. Fort Fisher was captured and the Confederate supply line was broken. Approximately three months after the fall of Fort Fisher, the Civil War came to an end.

In the late 19th century, a long rock jetty called "The Rocks" was built west of Fort Fisher to aid navigation by stopping shoaling in the Cape Fear River. Completed in 1881, The Rocks closed the former New Inlet, once used by Confederate blockade-runners to avoid the U.S. Navy, and created a lagoon, now called "The Basin" or Buzzards Bay. Today, The Rocks and The Basin are part of the Zeke's Island component of the North Carolina National Estuarine Research Reserve, an 1,160-acre (4.7 km^{2}) area of outstanding estuarine and ocean resources with extensive marshes and tidal flats. The Rocks stretch from Battery Buchanan, part of the surviving Fort Fisher complex, to Zeke's Island.

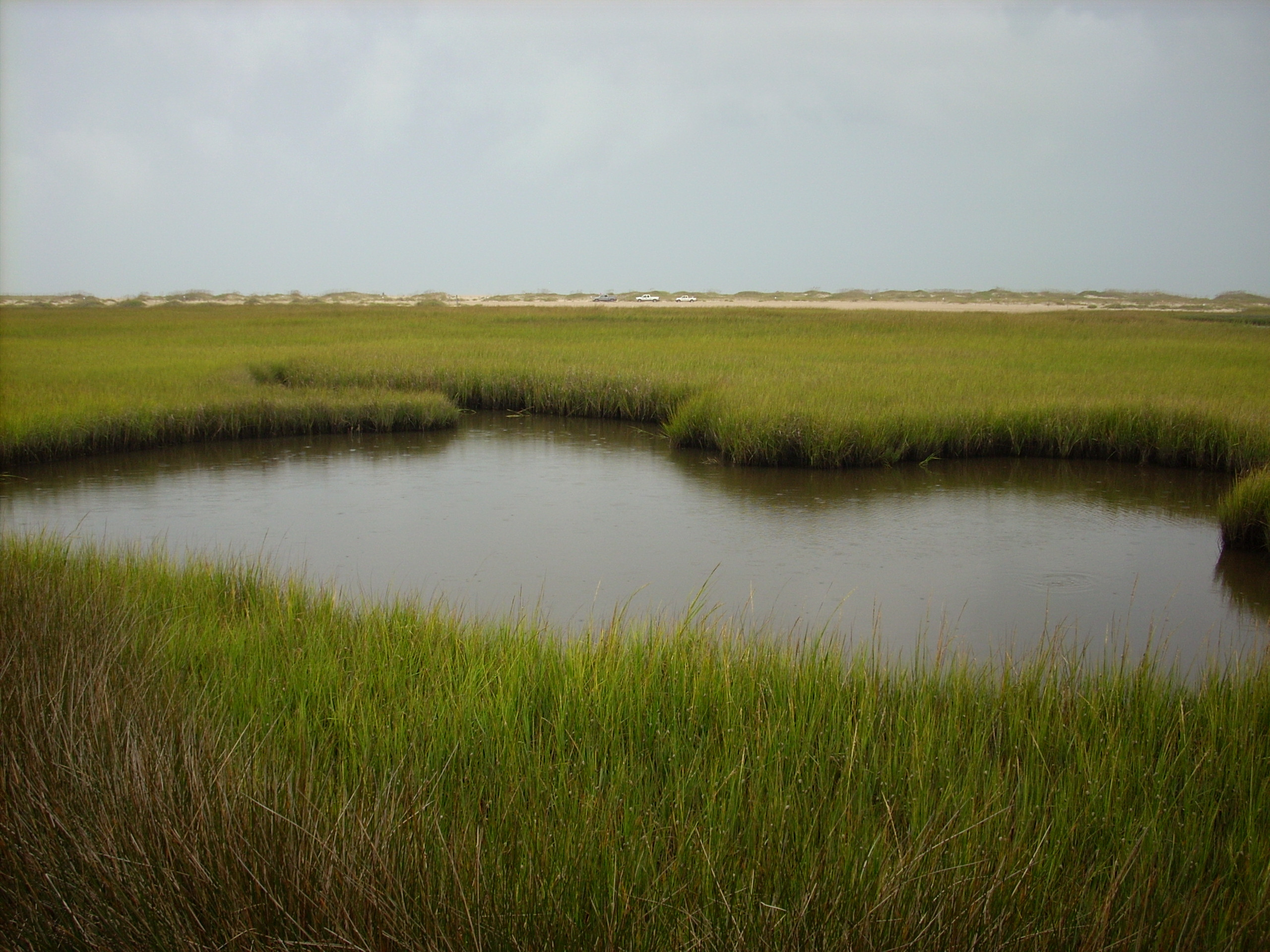
Salt Marsh off the Basin Trail, October 2007

During World War II a series of concrete fortifications was built along the coast of North Carolina. A grass landing strip was built through the earthworks of the fort, and it was used to resupply aircraft that patrolled the coast. The Fort Fisher visitor center was built in the middle of the landing strip, and the north end of the landing strip was paved for the visitor center parking lot. The outline of the original landing strip is still clearly visible, especially when viewed from aerial photos.

Throughout the 1980s and 1990s, beach erosion continued to wear away at the coastline near the fort. Much of the civil war era fort was lost to the sea. In 1999, construction began on a large seawall to prevent the fort from further erosion. The seawall was controversial because they tend to shift erosion to other parts of the beach, however it was completed in 2000 and it effectively stopped erosion in the area of the fort.

Preceded by Kure Beach	Beaches of Southeastern North Carolina	Succeeded by Zeke's Island
