= Fred Pickler =

American actor

- Born: William Frederick Pickler; Pinehurst, North Carolina, U.S.
- Occupations: Actor, author, deputy, photographer, salesman, Instructor
- Notable work: Blue Velvet

Fred Pickler is an American actor, author, former deputy sheriff and photographer, instructor in police chemical munitions in the US, Australia and New Zealand, and counter-terrorist munitions instructor, whose photographs have appeared in Life Magazine. He is possibly best remembered as Detective Tom Gordon/Yellow Man in David Lynch’s controversial film Blue Velvet, which Pickler almost walked out of during its premiere. He was also a deputy with the New Hanover County Sheriff’s Department for eight years, and chief evidence technician at the death scene of Robert Harrill. Pickler would eventually co-write The Reluctant Hermit of Fort Fisher about Harrill's life, and was elected president of the Fort Fisher Hermit Society, formed in Harrill's honor.

== Biography ==
Pickler was born in Pinehurst, North Carolina before moving to Wilmington at sixteen. From 1960 to 1962, he toured with the U.S. Army. He received an honorable discharge after being reassigned to Fort Huachuca for two years and there served on the post's rifle team for two years. Upon honorable discharge, his rank was Specialist Five (E-5)P. His military awards include a good conduct medal (2nd Award), Army of Occupation medal (Berlin), Armed Forces Expeditionary medal, Korea Service medal, Expert Infantry badge, Expert Qualification badges in rifle (M-1 & M-14), carbine (M-1), pistol (1911), first-class gunner-recoilless rifle, second class gunner-mortar, and graduate of the Seventh Army NCO Academy March 1962 and the US Army Security Agency Electronic Countermeasures Search and Analysis course in 1963. He became a notable photographer when hired for Wilmington’s Star-News, while also working as a stringer for United Press International.

In the author biography for The Reluctant Hermit of Fort Fisher, Pickler mentions having had numerous occupations, including driving trucks for the local zoo and an oil truck for a station at Carolina Beach, running a bar, and employment with the New Hanover County Sheriff's Department from 1971 through 1979, initially working undercover in narcotics and civil intelligence collection during some tumultuous times filled with racial tensions. His drug investigations resulted in penetrating two major heroin distribution gangs, the arrest and felony convictions of more than 35 hard drug dealers, and the arrest of members of a group called Rights of White People for building single and multiple-shot pipe guns. He rose to the rank of detective sergeant, then was an auxiliary police officer with the Carolina Beach Police Department for five years. He also taught riot control procedures and was a law enforcement firearms instructor in the southeastern parts of North Carolina through Cape Fear Technical College, Samson Tech, Wake Tech, Fayetteville, Greensboro, High Point, and an instructor at the Smith & Wesson Academy in chemical munitions. In later years he specialized in a police chemical munitions instructor course, then was a district sales manager with Smith & Wesson Law Enforcement Division from 1979–1986. Pickler then joined Aircraft Armaments Corporation for four years, again traveling to numerous locations in the US (including Hawaii) and Australia, again providing instruction in law enforcement chemical instructor courses. He was also employed with Applied Laser Systems selling weapon-mounted lasers in the US and Europe, departing after 1 year to become the US agent for NICO Pyrotechnik selling anti-terrorist munitions, and conducting training sessions and chemical munitions seminars at locations in the US. He retired after 25 years with NICO Pyrotechnik and Rheinmetall WM as their US agent to the Special Operations community. His sales activity took a company from selling less than $20,000 of products in the US annually to multi-million dollar contracts with police, federal agencies and the special operations community. He is still active in gun shows in Fayetteville, Raleigh and Charlotte, and preparing and assembling individual survival kits for two elite military agencies.

Pickler occasionally does interviews about his supporting role in the David Lynch movie Blue Velvet and the case involving Robert Harrill, as seen in the documentary The Fort Fisher Hermit: The Life & Death of Robert E. Harrill.
