= Alonzo H. Pickle =

American Civil War Medal of Honor recipient

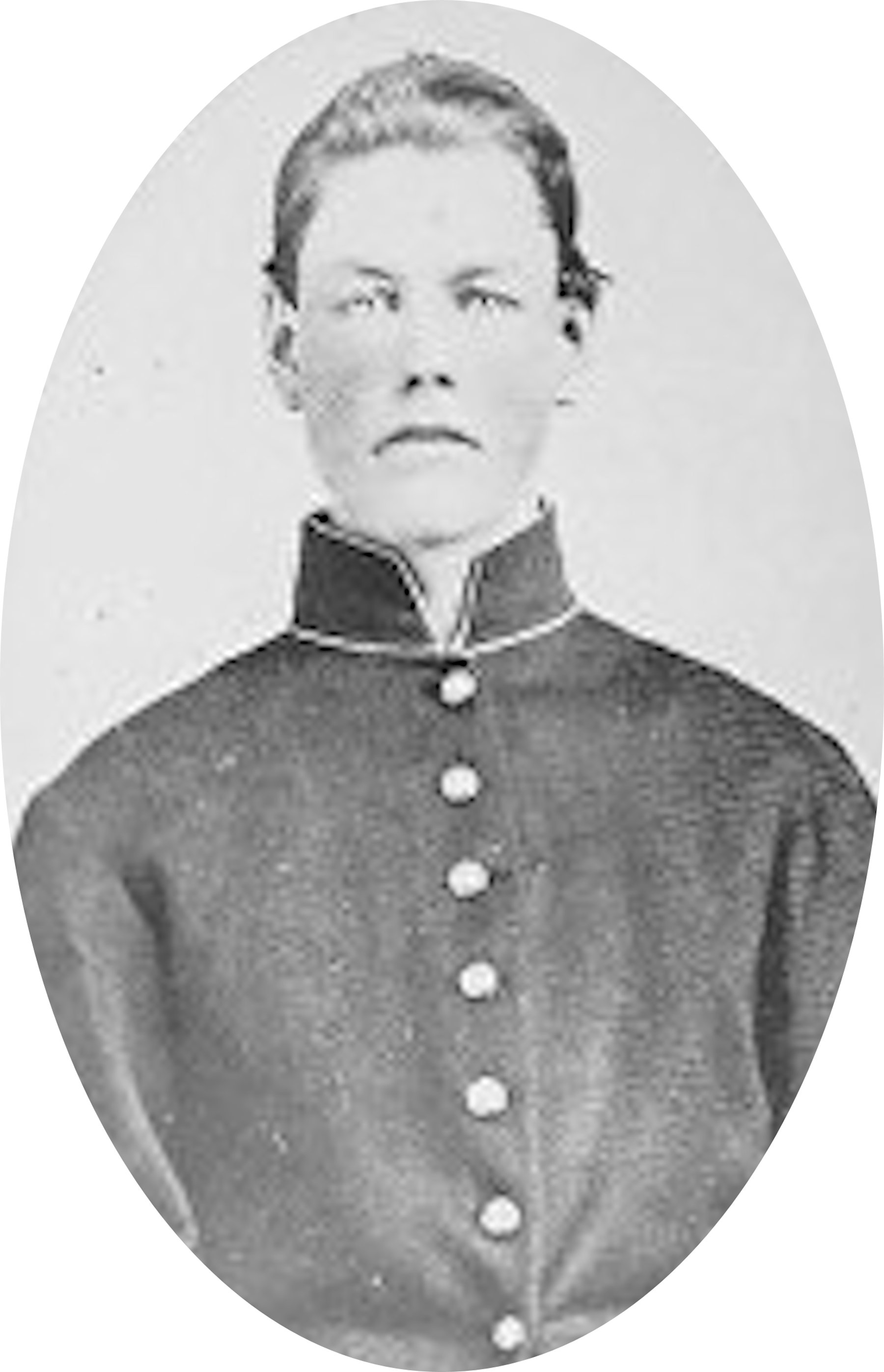
- Pickle, c. 1865
- Born: July 2, 1843
- Died: May 24, 1925
- Military career
- Rank: Sergeant
- Unit: 1st Battalion Minnesota Infantry
- Conflicts: American Civil War
- Awards: Medal of Honor

Alonzo H. Pickle (born July 2, 1843) was a Canadian-American soldier and member of the 1st Battalion Minnesota Infantry who fought in the American Civil War and was awarded the Medal of Honor for rescuing a wounded officer from the line of fire during the Second Battle of Deep Bottom.

== Biography ==
Alonzo Huntingdon Pickle was born in 1843 in Farnham, Quebec to Simon and Sarah Taylor Pickle, whose families had emigrated from Boston to Quebec. In 1857, the family moved to Wisconsin and then to a farm in Dover, Minnesota.

In 1862, Pickle enlisted in the First Minnesota Volunteer Infantry Regiment at Winona when he was still a Canadian citizen. He was sent to Fort Snelling to begin training, and assigned to Company K.

With the First Minnesota, Pickle participated in battles at Fredericksburg and Gettysburg, and was wounded in the leg during Pickett's Charge on his twentieth birthday. He was one of forty-seven survivors from Minnesota who fought in that battle.

He was promoted to corporal on February 1, 1864 and sent back to Fort Snelling to help recruit. He was promoted to sergeant on July 22 and transferred to Company B.

On August 14, 1864, Pickle fought in the Battle of Deep Bottom. When Lieutenant Henry O'Brien was shot in the shoulder and lung, Pickle carried him to safety. He was promoted again to first sergeant. He was present when General Robert E. Lee surrendered.

After the war, Pickle worked on his father's farm and married Rhoda Jane Smith in 1867. The couple moved to Winona where Pickle worked for a horse dealer and hauled bricks for the construction of Winona's Normal School. By 1869, the couple moved back to Olmsted County and rented a farm, where he and Rhoda raised six children. In 1888, Pickle bought land to farm in Home Township, but soon after moved to Sleepy Eye where he sold real estate and insurance.

Pickle was a member of the Grand Army of the Republic and a charter member of the Wesley Green GAR Post #71 in Sleepy Eye. When he died, he was its only surviving member. He attended many reunions around the country.

On June 5, 1897, he received the US Medal of Honor for rescuing Lieutenant O’Brien.

Pickle died on May 24, 1925. For his funeral, all businesses in Sleepy Eye closed from 1:30 to 3:00 so people could attend. He was buried in Home Cemetery in Home Township.
