= David Pichler =

David Pichler may refer to:

- David Pichler (diver) (born 1968), American Olympic diving competitor
- David Pichler (tennis) (born 1996), Austrian tennis player
