= Pickel =

Pickel is a surname. Notable people with the surname include:

- Allan Pickel (1878–1955), Canadian politician
- Bill Pickel (born 1959), American football player
- Charles Pickel (born 1997), Swiss footballer
- Clemens Pickel (born 1962), Russian Catholic bishop
- Follin Horace Pickel (1866–1949), Canadian politician
- Heinrich Pickel (1883–1964), German politician
- John Pickel (before 1814–1860 or later), Canadian lawyer and politician
- Marc Aurel Pickel (born 1971), German yacht racer

== Other ==
- Pickel, Missouri, a town in the US

== See also ==
- Pickle (disambiguation)
- Pickles (disambiguation)
