= Bernd Pichler =

German biomedical engineer

Bernd Pichler (born 26 December 1969) is a German biomedical engineer and expert in preclinical and molecular imaging as well as in imaging technology. He is Chair of the Department of Preclinical Imaging and Radiopharmacy as well as Director of the Werner Siemens Imaging Center at the University of Tübingen, Germany. From May 2020 to February 2026, he served as Dean of the Faculty of Medicine at the University of Tübingen and as a member of the University Hospital Executive Board of Directors.

== Life ==
Pichler grew up in Pfaffenhofen an der Ilm in Bavaria. After completing his high school education, he studied electrical engineering and biomedical engineering at the Technical University of Munich, Germany. Following his degree, he worked as a PhD student at the Clinic for Nuclear Medicine at the Technical University of Munich and the Max Planck Institute for Physics (Werner Heisenberg Institute). After gaining his doctoral degree (Dr. rer. nat.) in 2001, he initially worked as a post-doctoral research fellow at the Clinic of Nuclear Medicine. He moved to the University of California, Davis, as an Assistance Research Engineer (equal to Assistant Research Professor) in March 2003 and worked in the Department of Biomedical Engineering.

In January 2005, Pichler became Head of the Laboratory for Preclinical Imaging and Imaging Technology at the University of Tübingen and successfully completed his habilitation there in 2007. He has been a Full Professor at the University of Tübingen since 2008 and also Chair of the Department of Preclinical Imaging and Radiopharmacy at the Clinic of Radiology, which is part of University Hospital Tübingen, since January 2011. His professorship is funded by the Werner Siemens Foundation, which has its headquarters in Switzerland.

He was appointed Dean of the Faculty of Medicine in May 2020 and successfully led the institution until February 2026.

== Research ==
Pichler is primarily conducting research in the development of new imaging processes for fundamental pre-clinical research and clinical usage. He played a major role in the development of an imaging procedure which combines positron emission tomography (PET) and magnetic resonance tomography (MRT) in one device (PET/MR). The laboratory headed by Pichler primarily focuses on fundamental research into new diagnosis and treatment methods in the fields of oncology, neurology, cardiology and immunology. He is holder and applicant of many patents on integrated PET/MR scanners and radioactive tracers.

== Awards & achievements ==
- Gold Medal Award of the World Molecular Imaging Society, 2023
- George-de-Hevesy-Medal of the German Society of Nuclear Medicine, 2021
- Spokesperson of the Clusters of Excellence ‘Image-Guided and Functionally Instructed Tumor Therapies (iFIT)’ granted to the University of Tübingen by the German Research Foundation (Deutsche Forschungsgemeinschaft), 2019
- Elected Member of the German National Academy of Sciences Leopoldina, 2017
- Elected Member of the German Academy of Science and Engineering (acatech), 2015
- President of the European Society for Molecular Imaging (ESMI), 2014/2015
- Member of the Advisory Council of the Werner Siemens Foundation, 2012
- Advanced Grant from the European Research Council, 2012

== Selected publications ==
- Pezzana, Stefania; Blaess, Simone; Kortendieck, Jule; Hemmer, Nicole; Tako, Bredi; Pietura, Claudia; Ruoff, Lara; Riel, Simon; Schaller, Martin; Gonzalez-Menendez, Irene; Quintanilla-Martinez, Leticia; Mascioni, Alessandro; Aivazian, Argin; Wilson, Ian; Maurer, Andreas; Pichler, Bernd J; Kneilling, Manfred; Sonanini, Dominik (2024). "In-depth cross-validation of human and mouse CD4-specific minibodies for noninvasive PET imaging of CD4+ cells and response prediction to cancer immunotherapy". Theranostics. 14 (12): 4582–4597. doi:10.7150/thno.95173. PMC 11373626. PMID 39239511.
- Schwenck, Johannes; Sonanini, Dominik; Cotton, Jonathan M; Rammensee, Hans-Georg; la Fougère, Christian; Zender, Lars; Pichler, Bernd J (2023). "Advances in PET imaging of cancer". Nature Reviews Cancer. 23 (7): 474–490. doi:10.1038/s41568-023-00576-4. PMID 37258875.
- Katiyar, Prateek; Schwenck, Johannes; Frauenfeld, Leonie; Divine, Mathew R; Agrawal, Vaibhav; Kohlhofer, Ursula; Gatidis, Sergios; Kontermann, Roland; Königsrainer, Alfred; Quintanilla-Martinez, Leticia; la Fougère, Christian; Schölkopf, Bernhard; Pichler, Bernd J; Disselhorst, Jonathan (2023). "Quantification of intratumoural heterogeneity in mice and patients via machine-learning models trained on PET–MRI data". Nature Biomedical Engineering. 7 (8): 1014–1027. doi:10.1038/s41551-023-01047-9. PMID 37277483.
- Schwenck, Johannes; Maurer, Andreas; Beziere, Nicolas; Fiz, Francesco; Boschetti, Frederic; Geistlich, Susanne; Seyfried, Dominik; Gunzer, Matthias; Reischl, Gerald; Wehrmüller, Jöri; Ehrlichmann, Walter; Horger, Marius; Gatidis, Sergios; Davies, Genna; Vogel, Wichard; la Fougère, Christian; Pichler, Bernd; Thornton, Christopher (2022). "Antibody-guided Molecular Imaging of Aspergillus Lung Infections in Leukemia Patients". Journal of Nuclear Medicine. 63 (9): 1450–1451. doi:10.2967/jnumed.121.263251. hdl:10871/128390. PMID 35863897.
- Grimm, Jan; Kiessling, Fabian; Pichler, Bernd J (2020). "Quo Vadis, Molecular Imaging?". Journal of Nuclear Medicine. 61 (10): 1428–1434. doi:10.2967/jnumed.121.263251. hdl:10871/128390. PMID 32859706.
- Fischer, Katrin; Fenzl, Anna; Liu, Dianxin; Dyar, Kenneth A; Kleinert, Maximilian; Brielmeier, Markus; Clemmensen, Christoffer; Fedl, Anna; Finan, Brian; Gessner, Andre; Jastroch, Martin; Huang, Jianfeng; Keipert, Susanne; Klingenspor, Martin; Brüning, Jens C; Kneilling, Manfred; Maier, Florian C; Othman, Ahmed E; Pichler, Bernd J; Pramme-Steinwachs, Ines; Sachs, Stephan; Scheideler, Angelika; Thaiss, Wolfgang M; Uhlenhaut, Henriette; Ussar, Siegfried; Woods, Stephen C; Zorn, Julia; Stemmer, Kerstin; Collins, Sheila; Diaz-Meco, Maria; Moscat, Jorge; Tschöp, Matthias H; Müller, Timo D (2020). "The Scaffold Protein p62 Regulates Adaptive Thermogenesis Through ATF2 Nuclear Target Activation". Nature Communications. 11 (1): 2306. Bibcode:2020NatCo..11.2306F. doi:10.1038/s41467-020-16230-8. PMC 7211001. PMID 32385399.
- Brenner, Ellen; Schörg, Barbara F; Ahmetlić, Fatima; Wieder, Thomas; Hilke, Franz Joachim; Simon, Nadine; Schroeder, Christopher; Demidov, German; Riedel, Tanja; Fehrenbacher, Birgit; Schaller, Martin; Forschner, Andrea; Eigentler, Thomas; Niessner, Heike; Sinnberg, Tobias; Böhm, Katharina S; Hömberg, Nadine; Braumüller, Heidi; Dauch, Daniel; Zwirner, Stefan; Zender, Lars; Sonanini, Dominik; Geishauser, Albert; Bauer, Jürgen; Eichner, Martin; Jarick, Katja J; Beilhack, Andreas; Biskup, Saskia; Döcker, Dennis; Schadendorf, Dirk; Quintanilla-Martinez, Leticia; Pichler, Bernd J; Kneilling, Manfred; Mocikat, Ralf; Röcken, Marin (2020). "Cancer Immune Control Needs Senescence Induction by Interferon-Dependent Cell Cycle Regulator Pathways in Tumours". Nature Communications. 11 (1): 1335. Bibcode:2020NatCo..11.1335B. doi:10.1038/s41467-020-14987-6. PMC 7067802. PMID 32165639.
- Thunemann, Martin; Schörg, Barbara F; Feil, Susanne; Lin, Yun; Voelkl, Jakob; Golla, Matthias; Vachaviolos, Angelos; Kohlhofer, Ursula; Quintanilla-Martinez, Leticia; Olbrich, Marcus; Ehrlichmann, Walter; Reischl, Gerald; Griessinger, Christoph M; Langer, Harald F; Gawaz, Meinrad; Lang, Florian; Schäfers, Michael; Kneilling, Manfred; Pichler, Bernd J; Feil, Robert (2017). "Cre/lox-assisted Non-Invasive in Vivo Tracking of Specific Cell Populations by Positron Emission Tomography". Nature Communications. 8 (1): 444. Bibcode:2017NatCo...8..444T. doi:10.1038/s41467-017-00482-y. PMC 5585248. PMID 28874662.
- Kiessling, Fabian; Pichler, Bernd J; Hauff, Peter (2017). Small Animal Imaging - Bascis and Practical Guide (2 ed.). Springer International Publishing. ISBN 978-3-319-42202-2.
- Schmitz, Jennifer; Schwab, Julian; Schwenck, Johannes; Chen, Qian; Quintanilla-Martinez, Leticia; Hahn, Markus; Wietek, Beate; Schwenzer, Nina; Staebler, Annette; Kohlhofer, Ursula; Aina, Olulanu H; Hubbard, Neil E; Reischl, Gerald; Borowsky, Alexander D; Brucker, Sara; Nikolaou, Konstantin; La Fougère, Christian; Cardiff, Robert D; Pichler, Bernd J; Schmid, Andreas M (2016). "Decoding Intratumoral Heterogeneity of Breast Cancer by Multiparametric In Vivo Imaging: A Translational Study". Cancer Research. 76 (18): 5512–22. doi:10.1158/0008-5472.CAN-15-0642. PMC 5414858. PMID 27466286.
- Rolle, Anna-Maria; Hasenberg, Mike; Thornton, Christopher R; Solouk-Saran, Djamschid; Männ, Linda; Weski, Juliane; Maurer, Andreas; Fischer, Eliane; Spycher, Philipp R; Schibli, Roger; Boschetti, Frederic; Stegemann-Koniszewski, Sabine; Bruder, Dunja; Severin, Gregory W; Autenrieth, Stella E; Krappmann, Sven; Davies, Genna; Pichler, Bernd J; Gunzer, Matthias; Wiehr, Stefan (2016). "ImmunoPET/MR imaging allows specific detection of Aspergillus fumigatus lung infection in vivo". Proceedings of the National Academy of Sciences. 113 (8): E1026–33. Bibcode:2016PNAS..113E1026R. doi:10.1073/pnas.1518836113. PMC 4776455. PMID 26787852.
- Griessinger, Christoph M; Maurer, Andreas; Kesenheimer, Christian; Kehlbach, Rainer; Reischl, Gerald; Ehrlichmann, Walter; Bukala, Daniel; Harant, Maren; Cay, Funda; Brück, Jürgen; Nordin, Renate; Kohlhofer, Ursula; Rammensee, Hans-Georg; Quintanilla-Martinez, Leticia; Schaller, Martin; Röcken, Martin; Pichler, Bernd J; Kneilling, Manfred (2015). "^{64}Cu antibody-targeting of the T-cell receptor and subsequent internalization enables in vivo tracking of lymphocytes by PET". Proceedings of the National Academy of Sciences. 112 (4): 1161–6. Bibcode:2015PNAS..112.1161G. doi:10.1073/pnas.1418391112. PMC 4313850. PMID 25587131.
- Maier, Florian C; Wehrl, Hans F; Schmid, Andreas M; Mannheim, Julia G; Wiehr, Stefan; Lerdkrai, Chommanad; Calaminus, Carsten; Stahlschmidt, Anke; Ye, Lan; Burnet, Michael; Stiller, Detlef; Sabri, Osama; Reischl, Gerald; Staufenbiel, Mathias; Garaschuk, Olga; Jucker, Mathias; Pichler, Bernd J (2014). "Longitudinal PET-MRI reveals β-amyloid deposition and rCBF dynamics and connects vascular amyloidosis to quantitative loss of perfusion". Nature Medicine. 20 (12): 1485–92. doi:10.1038/nm.3734. PMID 25384087. S2CID 13287607.
- Wehrl, Hans F; Hossain, Mosaddek; Lankes, Konrad; Liu, Chih-Chieh; Bezrukov, Ilja; Martirosian, Petros; Schick, Fritz; Reischl, Gerald; Pichler, Bernd J (2013). "Simultaneous PET-MRI reveals brain function in activated and resting state on metabolic, hemodynamic and multiple temporal scales". Nature Medicine. 19 (9): 1184–9. doi:10.1038/nm.3290. PMID 23975025. S2CID 16315930.
- Müller-Hermelink, Nele; Braumüller, Heidi; Pichler, Bernd; Wieder, Thomas; Mailhammer, Reinhard; Schaak, Katrin; Ghoreschi, Kamran; Yazdi, Amir; Haubner, Roland; Sander, Christian A; Mocikat, Ralph; Schwaiger, Markus; Förster, Irmgard; Huss, Ralph; Weber, Wolfgang A; Kneilling, Manfred; Röcken, Martin (2008). "TNFR1 Signaling and IFN-γ Signaling Determine whether T Cells Induce Tumor Dormancy or Promote Multistage Carcinogenesis". Cancer Cell. 13 (6): 507–18. doi:10.1016/j.ccr.2008.04.001. PMID 18538734.
- Judenhofer, Martin S; Wehrl, Hans F; Newport, Danny F; Catana, Ciprian; Siegel, Stefan B; Becker, Markus; Thielscher, Axel; Kneilling, Manfred; Lichy, Matthias P; Eichner, Martin; Klingel, Karin; Reischl, Gerald; Widmaier, Stefan; Röcken, Martin; Nutt, Robert E; Machulla, Hans-Jürgen; Uludag, Kamil; Cherry, Simon R; Claussen, Claus D; Pichler, Bernd J (2008). "Simultaneous PET-MRI: A new approach for functional and morphological imaging". Nature Medicine. 14 (4): 459–65. doi:10.1038/nm1700. PMID 18376410. S2CID 205385255.
