= Pickle (app) =

British location-based, mobile freelance marketplace app

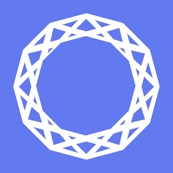
- Headquarters: Burnham, Slough, UK
- Industry: online marketplace

Pickle is a British location-based, mobile marketplace app that matches freelance labor with tasks posted by other users. It is based in Burnham, Slough, England.

The concept behind Pickle is to provide a streamlined, peer-to-peer platform that allows users to complete jobs for one another, while challenging the stigma of seeking help by incorporating social media. Users can negotiate how tasks are completed, as well as payment, which is processed through PayPal. Pickle takes a 10% commission from both users in each transaction.

One unique feature of the app is the ability to facilitate dares, which users are then rewarded for completing. Examples include shaving one's head or streaking in public.

Pickle has been compared to rival services TaskRabbit and Handy, however the integration of social media and commenting allows for more flexible transactions than in other services, according to the creators. The app is specifically targeted at Millennials and Generation Z.

== Development ==
Pickle founder Daneh Westropp was inspired to create the app after running away from home and school at the age of 15 and discovering a niche for Millennials wanting to make money while remaining independent. According to Westropp, Pickle aims to remedy the "boring interactions with the consumer" found on rival platforms by being "a social platform for jobs". The app's name refers to the ability of on-demand, outsourced labour to get oneself out of a 'pickle'.

The app was launched on iOS and Android in June 2015, to widespread acclaim from publications including Gizmodo and ShortList. Pickle gained over 1,500 user registrations in its first month of operation, the majority of whom are in the United Kingdom. In its first year, the company expanded to include four staff members, with an additional network of freelancers covering PR, design, legal and accounting. Since launching, the app has attracted several angel investors, including Frederic Hofmann, director at venture capital and advisory firm Anthemis Group which specialises in fintech startups.

In January 2017 Pickle was relaunched on iOS, with an updated Android app currently under development. Within months, the userbase grew to over 90,000 people around the world.

== Features ==
As the app does not impose a definition of what a job is, users are free to request everything from mundane tasks to elaborate dares. Pickle uses geolocation to connect users located near each other, however jobs which do not require physical presence can be completed from anywhere. Pickle users are divided into two groups: Do and Need. Users who "do" are those looking to complete jobs for payment, whereas users who "need" are those who post job listings.

Each job listing includes several criteria, such as a deadline for completion or specific instructions. Other users can then bid to be accepted for the job. As the payment can be advertised from the beginning, the bidding process also incorporates completion time and quality of execution, as well as users asking questions about the job. Job-posters are also able to cover additional costs of purchasing items that might be needed to complete their task, so as not to leave the user completing the job out of pocket.

Users looking to complete jobs can search on a map for opportunities near them. The app includes a filtering system through which users can search only for jobs matching their specific skillset, such as hairdressing or handyman work. These skillets can also be viewed by job-posters, giving them insight into the background and abilities of each bidder. Users can also choose to be notified if a job is advertised matching their skillset, location and price range.

Pickle also links with users' Facebook and Twitter profiles, while additional social features allow users to negotiate payment either publicly or privately. Users who have successfully bid to complete a job can also make phone calls with the job-poster. Other social features include public comment threads on each job listing, the use of hashtags, and galleries on users' profile pages.

== See also ==
- Kolabtree
