= Johannes W. Pichler =

Austrian academic (born 1947)

Johannes Werner Pichler (born July 1, 1947 in Linz, Austria) is an Austrian law professor for European legal development at the University of Graz, Austria and director of the Austrian Institute of Legal Policy in Salzburg.

== Education ==
Pichler studied law at the Universities of Vienna and Salzburg, where he earned his doctorate degree in 1971.

== Career ==
After his studies, Pichler worked as assistant professor for legal history at the University of Salzburg, before he became full professor for European legal development at the University of Graz in 1994, where he holds the chair for Development of European law at the University of Graz. Since 1986, he leads the independent research institute Austrian Institute for European Law and Policy in Salzburg, which focuses on European legal policy since 2008. In these capacities, his research focused on acceptance of law, certainty of justice on the internet, family and marriage law, healthcare law, industrial law, youth law and patients' rights.

Pichler is chairman of the association Europe needs initiative and member of the advisory council of the Initiative and Referendum Institute Europe. Both associations were instrumental for the introduction of the European Citizens' Initiative in 2012. Johannes Pichler is also a member of the advisory council for the law symposium of the European Forum Alpbach.

Until 1999, he was a member of the Austrian Peoples' Party (ÖVP), but left the party out of protest against the coalition with the Freedom Party of Austria(FPÖ).

== Personal life ==
He is married, has three children, and lives in Graz and Salzburg.

== Monographs and published books ==
- The Former Rural Property Ownership of Salzburg. (= Grundfragen von Staat und Recht, Vol. 15), Salzburg-Munich 1979. (in German)
- Necessitas. An Element of Medieval and Modern Law. Portrayed on the Example of Austrian Legal Sources. (= Schriften zur Rechtsgeschichte, Heft 27), Berlin 1983. (in German)
- The Swedish Tenancy Law. A legal dogmatic comparison with regard to developments in the Austrian Tenancy Law. Salzburg 1984. (in German)
- International Developments in Patients’ Rights. (= Schriften zur Rechtspolitik, Vol. 4), Vienna-Cologne-Weimar 1992. (in German)
- The Austrian Patients’ Rights Charta. A Discussion Draft. Salzburg 1992. (in German)
- Legal Acceptance. An Empirical Study of the Legal Culture from the Perspective of Ideas, Values and Convictions. Portrayed at the Example of the Austrian Opinion Poll (together with Karim J. Giese), (= Schriften zur Rechtspolitik, Vol. 6/I and Vol. 6/II), Vienna-Cologne-Weimar 1993. (in German)
- Law Developments to Fault-Independent Compensation in the Medical Field. Vol. 1: Patient Insurance Rights in Sweden, Finland und Denmark (= Schriften zur Rechtspolitik, Bd. 7), Vienna-Cologne-Weimar 1994. (in German)
- Legal Acceptance. Are Findings Sufficient or are also Tasks Required? (= Kleine Arbeitsreihe zur europäischen und vergleichenden Rechtsgeschichte, H 22), Graz 1996. (in German)
- European Legal Development of Environmental Damage Insurance: The Models of Sweden and the Netherlands. An Introduction based on the “White Paper on Environmental Liability” of the European Commission. With Comments of the Austrian Association of Insurance Companies. (= Schriften zur Rechtspolitik, Vol. 15), Vienna 2001. (in German)

== Edited volumes ==
- Pichler, J. and T. Mayer-Maly, Housing and Law (= Recht und Wirklichkeit Vol. 1), Salzburg 1983. (in German)
- Pichler, J., Mell, W.-R., Miehlser, H. and K.J.P. Parisot, The HDG of 1985. An Alternative Draft for a ‚Hochschullehrerdienstrecht’. Salzburg 1984, 40 p. (in German)
- Pichler, J., T. Mayer-Maly, Schick, P.J., Penalty and Justice (= Recht und Wirklichkeit Vol. 2), Salzburg 1986. (in German)
- Pichler, J. and Oberläuter, B., Participation and Involvement in Social Housing (= Korrekturen Vol. 3) Salzburg 1988. (in German)
- Pichler, J. and Quené, T., Social Partnership and Legal Policy. Change Opportunities Based on the Dutch Social Economic Council (SER) Model (= Schriften zur Rechtspolitik, Vol 2, Vienna-Cologne 1990. (in German)
- Pichler, J., Introduction to the Patient Rights Policy (= Schriften zur Rechtspolitik, Vol. 3), Vienna-Cologne 1990. (in German)
- Pichler, J., What's the Impact of Scientific Legal Policy? Symposion on the Occasion of the Opening of the Austrian Institute for Legal Policy (June 15, 1989) (= Schriften zur Rechtspolitik, Vol.1), Vienna-Cologne 1991. (in German)
- Pichler, J., Bydlinski, F., Mayer-Maly, T., The Renaissance of Codification: The Novel Dutch Civil Code 1992 (= Schriften zur Rechtspolitik, Vol. 5), Vienna-Cologne-Weimar 1991. (in German)
- Pichler, J., Rauch-Kallat, M., Developments in the Children Rights’ Laws with Regard to the UN-Convention on Children's’ Rights. (= Schriften zur Rechtspolitik, Vol. 8), Vienna-Cologne-Weimar 1994. (in German)
- Pichler, J., Harmonization Demand of Youth (Protection) Legislation by the Austrian Federal States. A Comparison. (= Schriften zur Rechtspolitik, Vol. 9), Vienna-Cologne-Weimar 1997. (in German)
- Pichler, J., Legal Acceptance and Action Orientation (= Schriften zur Rechtspolitik, Vol. 10), Vienna-Cologne-Weimar 1998. (in German)
- Pichler, J., “New” Employment. The Legal Challenges (= Schriften zur Rechtspolitik, Vol. 11), Vienna 1999. (in German)
- Pichler, J., Ziegerhofer A., Likar, R., The “United States of Europe“. Documents of a Genesis, Vienna 1999. (in German)
- Pichler, J., Aichhorn, U., Gamper, T., Youth Development Rights. A European Law Comparison (= Schriften zur Rechtspolitik, Vol. 12), Vienna 2000. (in German)
- Pichler, J., Legal Strategies for Coping with the Changing Face of Working Life (= Schriften zur Rechtspolitik, Vol. 13), Vienna 2000. (in German)
- Pichler, J., Compulsory Insurance and Health Insurance Affairs (= Schriften zur Rechtspolitik, Vol. 14), Vienna 2001. (in German)
- Pichler, J., Embryonic Stem-Cell Therapy versus „alternative“ Stem-Cell Therapy (= Schriften zur Rechtspolitik, Vol. 16), Vienna 2002. (in German)
- Pichler, J., eBusiness versus Laws. Is Law Constraining eCommerce without Serving as an Urgently Needed Protection? (= Schriften zur Rechtspolitik, Vol. 17), Vienna 2002. (in German)
- Pichler, J., and Ferz, S., Mediation in the Public Domain (= Schriften zur Rechtspolitik, Vol. 19), Vienna 2003. (in German)
- Pichler, J., Smoking & Law (= Schriften zur Rechtspolitik, Vol. 20), Vienna 2004. (in German)
- Pichler, J., and Grillberger, K., Deductibles in the Statutory Health Insurance from an Economical and Legal Perspective (= Schriften zur Rechtspolitik, Vol. 23), Vienna-Graz 2005. (in German)
- Pichler, J., and Gruber, M., Business Mediation between Theory and Practice (= Schriften zur Rechtspolitik, Vol. 24), Vienna-Graz 2005. (in German)
- Pichler, J. and Stolz, V, Consumer protection law for online auctions (= Schriften zur Rechtspolitik, Vol. 25), Vienna-Graz 2006. (in German)
- Pichler, J., eAuction business versus legal certainty (= Schriften zur Rechtspolitik, Vol. 26), Vienna-Graz 2007. (in German)
- Pichler, J., Let's change Europe! The European Initiative Art 11(4) EU Treaty / Treaty of Lisbon (= Schriften zur Rechtspolitik, Vol. 27/28), Vienna-Graz 2008. (in German and English)
- Pichler, J., Direct Democracy in the European Union/Direkte Demokratie in der Europäischen Union (= Schriften zur Rechtspolitik, Vol. 29), Vienna-Graz 2009. (in German and English)
- Picher J. and Kaufmann, B., The European Citizens’ Initiatives – into new democratic territory (= Schriften zur Rechtspolitik, Vol. 30), Vienna-Graz 2010. (in English)
- Pichler J., Reflections on improving democratic participation - provocations and options (= Schriften zur Rechtspolitik, Vol. 31), Vienna-Graz 2010. (in German)
- Picher J. and Kaufmann, B., The next big thing – Making Europe ready for the Citizens’ Initiative (= Schriften zur Rechtspolitik, Vol. 32), Vienna-Graz 2010. (in English)
- Picher J. and Kaufmann, B., Modern Transnational Democracy – How the 2012 launch of the European Citizens’ Initiative can change the world (= Schriften zur Rechtspolitik, Vol. 33), Vienna-Graz 2011. (in English)
- Picher J. and Balthasar, A., Open Dialogue between EU Institutions and Citizens – Chances and Challenges (= Schriften zur Rechtspolitik, Vol. 35), Vienna-Graz 2013. (in English)
