= Pickle (company) =

American fashion rental and resale marketplace

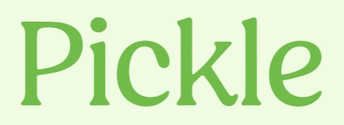
- Pickle logo
- Type: Private
- Industry: Fashion, e-commerce
- Founded: 2022
- Founders: Julia O'Mara; Brian McMahon
- Headquarters: New York City, United States
- Area served: United States
- Products: Peer-to-peer clothing rental; resale
- Website: shoponpickle.com

Pickle is an American peer-to-peer fashion rental and resale marketplace founded in 2022 by Julia O'Mara and Brian McMahon. It is headquartered in New York City.

The platform enables individuals to rent clothing and accessories directly from one another through a mobile marketplace. In a 2025 profile, Fortune described Pickle as “the Airbnb of fashion.”

== History ==
Pickle was founded by Julia O'Mara and Brian McMahon, who previously worked together at Blackstone. The company initially launched as a social polling platform intended to help users crowdsource shopping decisions. Later in 2022, the founders shifted the focus of the platform toward peer-to-peer fashion rental after observing that users were frequently recommending and offering items from their own closets.

As the marketplace gained traction, Pickle raised an $8 million seed funding round in October 2023 led by Craft Ventures and FirstMark Capital. Two months later, the company opened its first brick-and-mortar retail location in New York City’s West Village. In March 2025, Pickle announced a $12 million Series A round to support continued expansion.

== Business model ==
Pickle operates as a peer-to-peer marketplace where users list apparel and accessories for rent or resale. Owners set their own rental and resale prices, while the company recommends that rentals cost between 10 and 20 percent of an item’s retail value and takes a commission on each transaction. Shoppers can browse listings by brand, category, seller, or geographic location and select rental periods or purchase items outright when available. Depending on location, exchanges may take place in person, through local courier delivery, or via shipping within the United States.

In addition to its online platform, Pickle operates a physical retail location in Manhattan’s West Village that allows customers to browse and try on items sourced from individual closets on the marketplace.

== Reception ==
Pickle has been covered by business and lifestyle media as part of a broader shift toward peer-to-peer commerce and clothing rental. Coverage has highlighted the platform within the context of the growing “side hustle” economy, with some users reporting supplemental income generated through renting items from their wardrobes.

Industry publications have described the company as part of a new category of rental marketplaces enabling individuals to monetize personal belongings. Lifestyle outlets have characterized Pickle as a platform allowing users to borrow apparel and accessories from others in their local communities.

== Leadership ==
O'Mara is as chief operating officer and McMahon chief executive officer. Both founders were named to a Forbes 30 Under 30 list in 2024, and O'Mara has also been recognized on Inc. magazine’s Female Founders list.
