= Roman Pichler =

Roman Pichler can refer to:

- Roman Pichler (footballer) (born 1941), Austrian footballer
- Roman Pichler (luger), Italian luger
