= Hans Pichler (philosopher) =

German philosopher

Hans Pichler (German: [ˈpɪçlɐ]; 26 February 1882, Leipzig – 10 November 1958, Bonn) was a German philosopher. A student of Windelband and Meinong, he revived in his work the philosophy of Wolff contra the idealism of the neo-Kantians, particularly in his Über Christian Wolffs Ontologie (1910). Among those influenced by Pichler's turn to realist ontology was Nicolai Hartmann.

== Selected works ==
- Über Christian Wolffs Ontologie [On the ontology of Christian Wolff] (in German). Leipzig: Verlag der Dürr'schen Buchhandlung. 1910.
