= Walter Pichler =

Walter Pichler may refer to:

- Walter Pichler (biathlete) (born 1959), German Olympic biathlete
- Walter Pichler (artist), Austrian sculptor
