= Joseph Pichler =

Joseph Pichler may refer to:

- Joseph Pichler (painter) (1730–1808), Austrian painter
- Joe Pichler (born 1987), American child actor who disappeared in 2006
