= Hans Pichler (dental surgeon) =

Austrian dental surgeon (1877–1949)

Hans Pichler (9 January 1877, Vienna – 3 February 1949, Vienna) was an Austrian dentist and maxillofacial surgeon. He is known for treating Sigmund Freud.
