= Church of the Holy Spirit =

Church of the Holy Spirit or Holy Spirit Church may refer to:

== Estonia ==
- Church of the Holy Spirit, Tallinn
- Holy Spirit Church, Valga

== France ==
- Church of the Holy Spirit, Paris

== India ==
- Holy Spirit Church, Nandakhal
- Holy Spirit Church, Margao

== Germany ==
- Church of the Holy Spirit, Heidelberg
- Church of the Holy Spirit, Wolfsburg, Germany
- Heilig-Geist-Kirche, Munich
- St. Matthew, Leipzig, formerly Heiliggeistkirche (Church of the Holy Spirit)
- Holy Spirit (Pfaffenhofen an der Ilm)

== Italy ==
- Church of the Holy Spirit (Ravenna)
- Church of the Holy Spirit (Alcamo), Trapani, Sicily
- Church of the Holy Spirit, Palermo, Sicily

== Slovakia ==
- Church of the Holy Spirit, Bratislava
- Holy Spirit Church (Košice)

== Ukraine ==
- Church of the Holy Spirit, Chernihiv

== United Kingdom ==
- Church of the Holy Spirit, Burpham, Surrey
- Holy Spirit Church, Newtown, Isle of Wight

== United States ==
- Holy Spirit Church (Stamford, Connecticut)
- Church of the Holy Spirit (Lake Wales, Florida)
- Church of the Holy Spirit (Roanoke, Virginia)

== Other places ==
- Holy Spirit Church, Bale, Croatia
- Church of the Holy Spirit, Prague, Czech Republic
- Church of the Holy Ghost, Copenhagen, Denmark
- Church of the Holy Spirit (Batumi), Georgia's autonomous republic of Adjara
- Holy Spirit Church (Sajópálfala), Hungary
- Holy Spirit Church Nandakhal, India
- Orthodox Church of the Holy Spirit, Vilnius, Lithuania
- Church of the Holy Spirit, Żejtun, Malta
- Church of the Holy Spirit in Warsaw, Poland
- Church of the Holy Spirit, Lund, Sweden
- Church of the Real Colegio del Espíritu Santo (La Clerecía) in Salamanca; Spain

== See also ==
- Church of the Holy Ghost (disambiguation)
- Holy Spirit Cathedral (disambiguation)
- Church of the Holy Spirit, Vilnius (disambiguation)
