= Church of the Holy Ghost =

Church of the Holy Ghost or Holy Ghost Catholic Church may refer to:

- Church of the Holy Ghost, Copenhagen, Denmark
- Holy Ghost Church, Basingstoke, Hampshire, England
- Church of the Holy Ghost, Crowcombe, Somerset, England
- Church of the Holy Ghost, Midsomer Norton, Somerset, England
- Church of the Holy Ghost, Yeovil, Somerset, England
- Church of the Holy Ghost, Tallinn, Estonia
- Church of the Holy Ghost, Bern, Switzerland
- Holy Ghost Catholic Church (Bagamoyo), Tanzania
- Holy Ghost Catholic Church (Denver, Colorado), United States
- Holy Ghost Catholic Church (Kula, Hawaii), United States
- Holy Ghost Catholic Church (Dubuque, Iowa), United States
- Holy Ghost Church (Opelousas, Louisiana), United States
- Holy Ghost Byzantine Catholic Church (Pittsburgh), Pennsylvania, United States

== See also ==
- Church of the Holy Spirit (disambiguation)
- Holy Ghost High School (1874–1971), Opelousas, Louisiana, United States
- Holy Ghost Preparatory School (1897–present), Bensalem, Pennsylvania, United States
