= Golaš, Istria County =

Golaš Moncalvo
- Village
- Location within Croatia
- Coordinates: 45.0743833°N 13.7348096°E
- Country: Croatia
- County: Istria
- Municipality: Bale

Area
  - Total: 4.6 sq mi (11.8 km^{2})

Population (2021)
  - Total: 120
  - Density: 26/sq mi (10/km^{2})
- Time zone: UTC+1 (CET)
  - Summer (DST): UTC+2 (CEST)
- Postal code: 52352 Kanfanar
- Area code: 52

Golaš (Italian: Moncalvo) is a village in Istria, Croatia.

== Demographics ==
According to the 2021 census, its population was 120.
