= Brothers Zubalashvili =

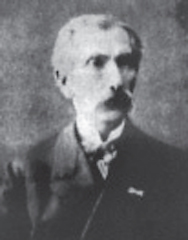
Constantine Zubalashvili

Brothers Zubalashvili (Georgian: ძმები ზუბალაშვილები) was a family of businessmen and benefactors. The Zubalashvili family gained prominence in the seventeenth century and established themselves as successful merchants conducting business throughout Asia and Europe. They helped Kings Vakhtang VI and Erekle II establish printing presses in Tbilisi in the 18th century. After the Russian annexation of Georgia, the Zubalashvilis developed a profitable trade network that covered Russia, the Ottoman Empire, India, and Persia. In the mid-19th century, they also began establishing the first industrial plants in Georgia.

Ivane Zubalashvili (1792–1864) built the first sugar refinery and vodka plant in late 1830s, while Constantine Zubalashvili (1828–1901) and his sons Stephan, Peter, and Jacob, used their large fortune for public charity and left a legacy in many buildings in Tbilisi and throughout the country. They constructed hotels, a music school, shelters, a public library (currently Marjanishvili Theater), and the building of the Noble Gymnasium and funded the construction of several churches throughout the country (e.g. Batumi Cathedral). They also financially supported the national liberation movements of the late 19th century, providing finances to the Society for the Advancements of Learning among the Georgians and several newspapers and journals, including Iveria and Jejili.

== Gallery ==
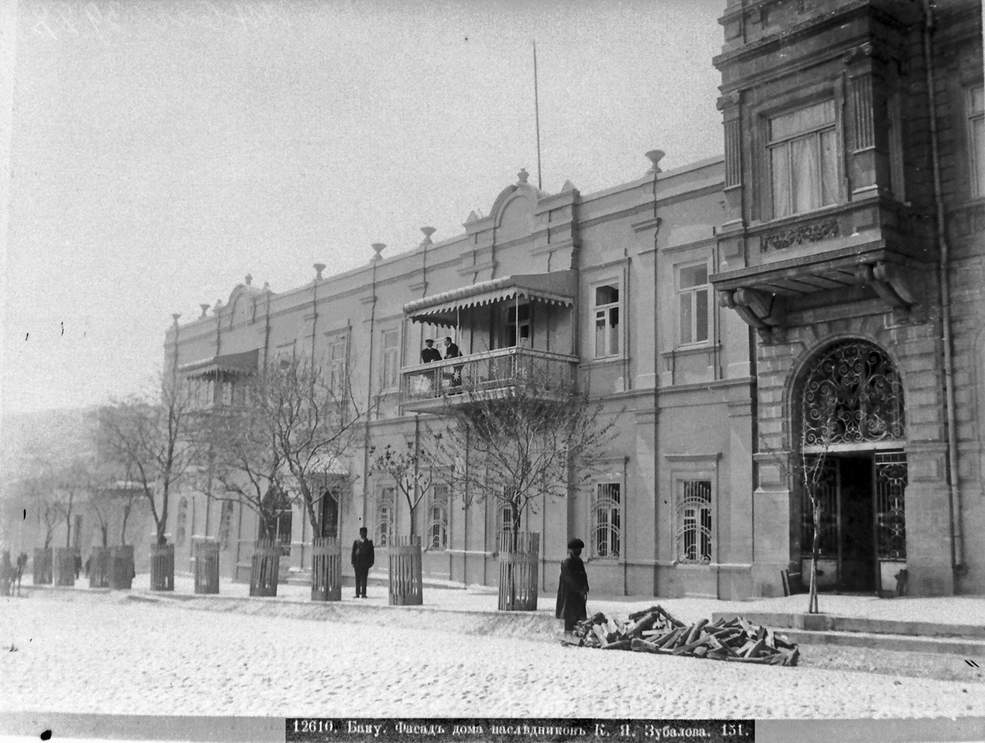
Zubalashvili house and office in Baku

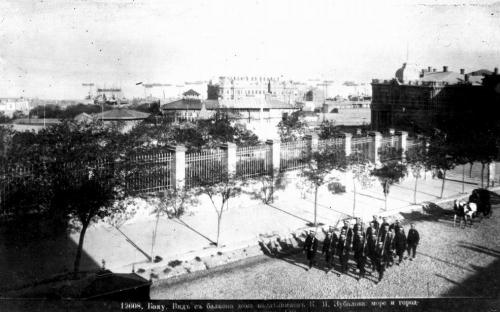
View from the Zubalashvilis house (Baku)

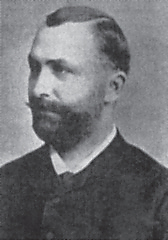
Stepan Zubalashvili

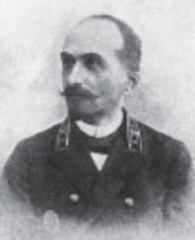
Petre Zubalashvili

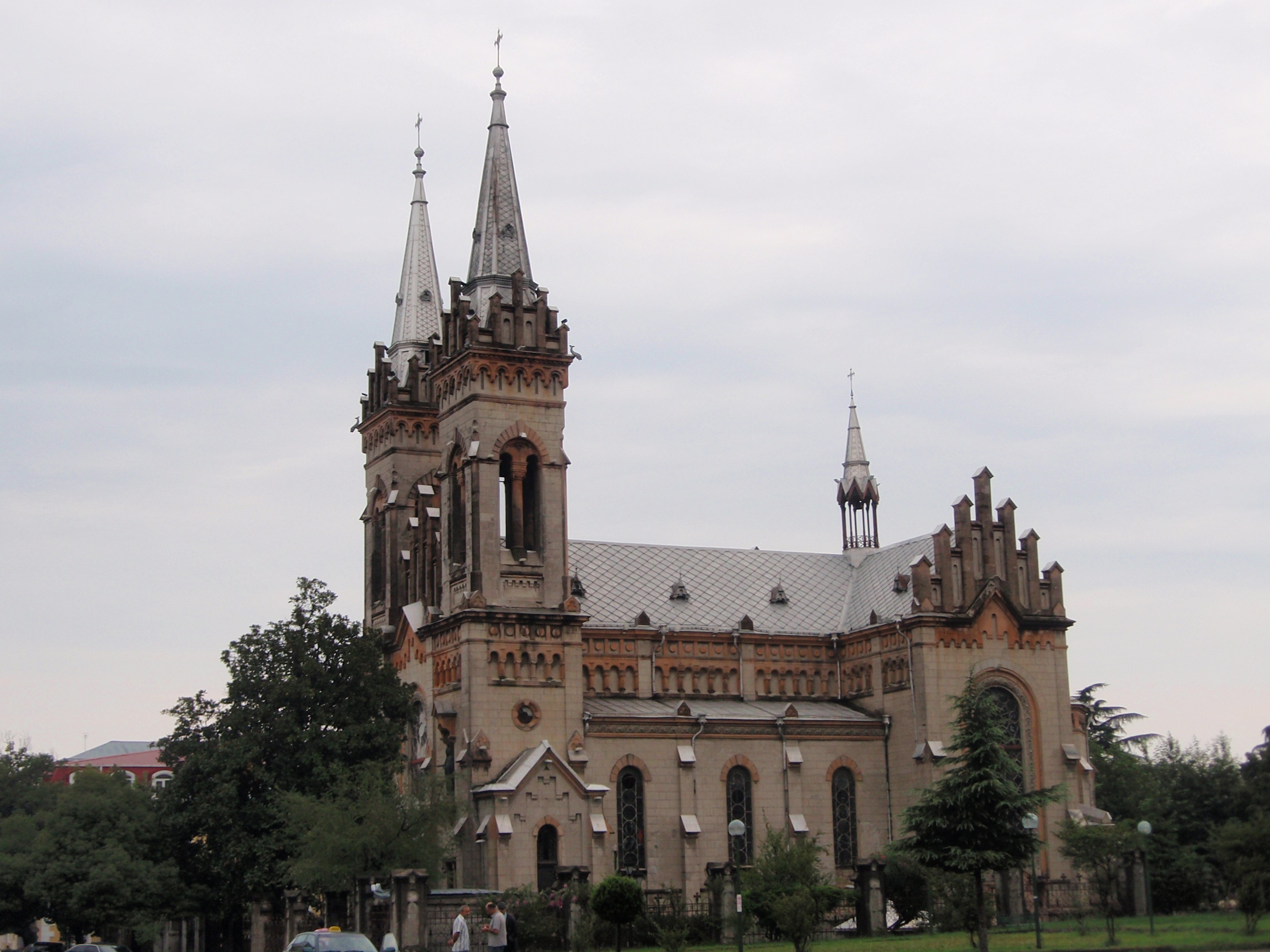
Batumi Cathedral

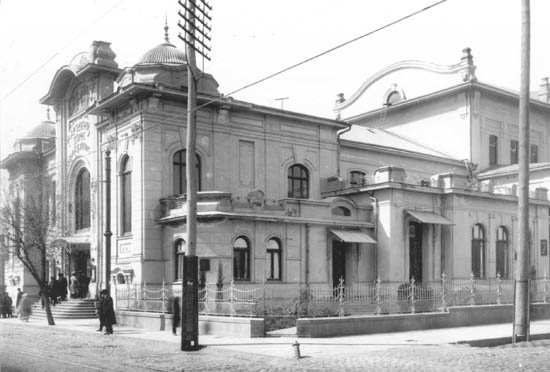
Marjanishvili Theatre building

== Sources ==
- Alexander Mikaberidze — Historical Dictionary of Georgia, Historical Dictionaries of Europe, No. 50 (The Scarecrow Press, Inc. Lanham, Maryland • Toronto • Plymouth, UK. 2007)
