= Krmed =

- Village
- Location within Croatia
- Coordinates: 45.0562018°N 13.7757907°E
- Country: Croatia
- County: Istria
- Municipality: Bale

Area
  - Total: 12.8 sq mi (33.2 km^{2})

Population (2021)
  - Total: 77
  - Density: 6.0/sq mi (2.3/km^{2})
- Time zone: UTC+1 (CET)
  - Summer (DST): UTC+2 (CEST)
- Postal code: 52352 Kanfanar
- Area code: 52

Krmed is a village in Istria, Croatia.

== History ==
On 25 March 2022 at 12:37 the ŽVOC Pula received a call about a wildfire in the area. 12 hectares (30 acres) burned by the time it was put out at 20:22 by JVP Rovinj, JVP Pula, DVD Kanfanar, DVD Rovinjsko Selo 1982 and DVD Bale.

== Demographics ==
According to the 2021 census, its population was 77.
