= Bale, Croatia =

Bale Valle
- Municipality
- Bale Municipality; Općina Bale - Comune di Valle
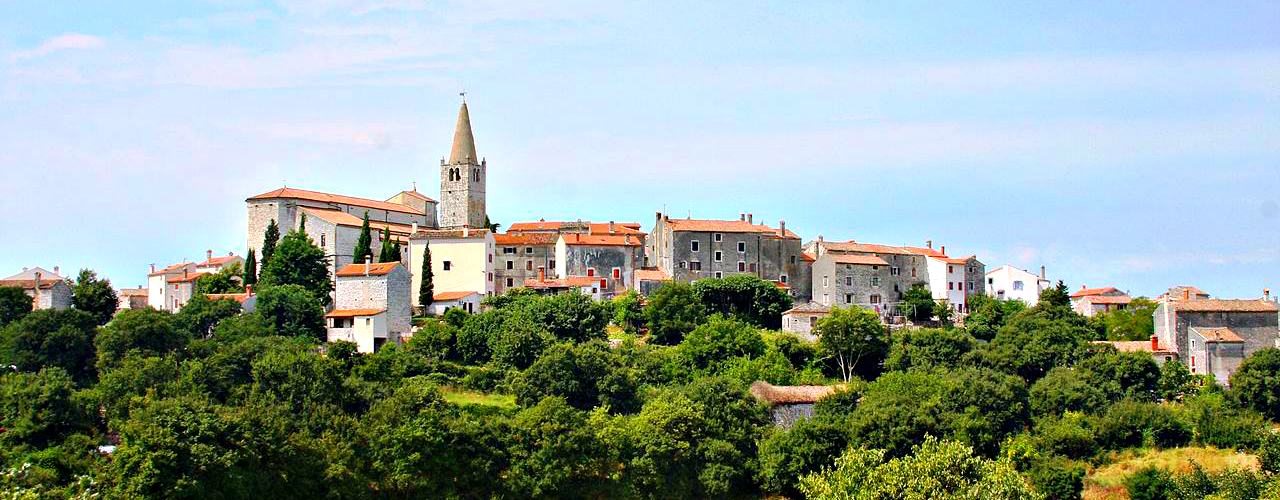
- View of Bale

- Flag
- Interactive map of Bale
- Location within Croatia
- Coordinates: 45°02′N 13°46′E
- Country: Croatia
- County: Istria County

Government
  - Mayor: Edi Pastrovicchio (Independent)

Area
  - Municipality: 31.7 sq mi (82.1 km^{2})
  - Urban: 14.3 sq mi (37.1 km^{2})
- Elevation: 466 ft (142 m)

Population (2021)
  - Municipality: 1,170
  - Density: 36.9/sq mi (14.3/km^{2})
  - Urban: 973
  - Urban density: 67.9/sq mi (26.2/km^{2})
- Time zone: UTC+1 (CET)
  - Summer (DST): UTC+2 (CEST)
- Postal code: 52210 Rovinj
- Area code: 52
- Website: opcina.bale-valle.hr

Bale (Venetian: Vałe; Italian: Valle, previously Valle d'Istria; Istriot: Vale) is a settlement and municipality in Istria County, Croatia. It is the site of the Roman ruins of Castrum Vallis.

The municipality covers a total area of 81.65 km^{2} (31.53 sq mi) and has a total population of 1,170. The municipality is officially bilingual, Croatian and Italian, hence both names are official and equal. Bale-Valle is connected to the Croatian highway network by an exit on the A9 motorway (E751), part of the Istrian Y.

== History ==
Dinosaur fossils have been found near Bale. The most significant fossils are the fossils of Histriasaurus, which was discovered at this site and are kept at the local museum.. Of the other dinosaur fossils, unidentified fossils belonging to the Camarasauridae family, the clusters Titanosauriformes, Somphospondyli, Theropoda, and another fossil of an unidentified dinosaur were found. A fossil of Campanellula capuensis belonging to the Cretaceous of the genus Campanellula was also found. These fossils were described by Fabio Marco Dalla Vecchia from 1998 to 2005.

The origins of the settlement lie in the Roman stronghold of Castrum Vallis, built by Caius Palcrus to protect the salt-pan road from Pula-Pola to Poreč-Parenzo. Vallum means moat, so it is assumed that the ancient stronghold was protected by a moat. Coins found from this period have been found around Bale, and a number of ruins of Roman buildings remain.

A defensive system including fortified settlements Vallis, Duo Castra and Stari Gočan, and castra Parentinski Vrh and Klenovac, existed in the Late Roman period around the border of the Pula ager. Vallis was part of the inner fortification belt along with Mutvoran and Klenovac, monitoring the Pola-Tergeste road (the Via Flavia). The walls of Vallis were constructed in a herringbone pattern. It had a three nave church dedicated to Mary, mother of Jesus. The church began as a trapezoid hall church with no apse, and was constructed in the 5th century.

The modern town of Bale was built around the medieval castle of the noble families Sardo and Bembo from the 15th century. Its parish had already been founded by 1177. Pastoral visitations (Note: In the 17th and 18th centuries, these were: 1602, 1603, 1625, 1634, 1639, 1645, 1649, 1653, 1657, 1663, 1668, 1676, 1683, 1688, 1692, 1697, 1701, 1714, 1719, 1721, 1726, 1727, 1728, 1729, 1730, 1732, 1737, 1741, 1748 and 1779.) by the Bishop of Poreč provide valuable sources for Bale's history.

== Geography ==
The municipality of Bale borders the town of Rovinj, the municipalities of Kanfanar, Svetvinčenat and Vodnjan. The village is 13 km away from Rovinj and 20 km from Pula. The rocks of Kolona and Porer belong to the municipality.

The area of the municipality of Bale is 81.90 km2.

== Demographics ==
According to the 2021 census, its population was 1,170. The municipality consisted of the following settlements:

- Bale-Valle, population 973
- Golaš-Moncalvo, population 120
- Krmed-Carmedo, population 77
Bale: Population trends 1857–2021
v

population	1700	1729	1847	2033	2207	2657	2554	2649	1961	1439	1130	1038	1014	1064	1047	1127	1170
	1857	1869	1880	1890	1900	1910	1921	1931	1948	1953	1961	1971	1981	1991	2001	2011	2021

Sources: Croatian Bureau of Statistics publications

According to official data from 2011, the municipality of Bale has 1,127 inhabitants.

=== Notable people ===
- Blessed Juliano Balski, Franciscan, priest, (died 1349)
- Domenico Cernecca, linguist and journalist

== Administration ==
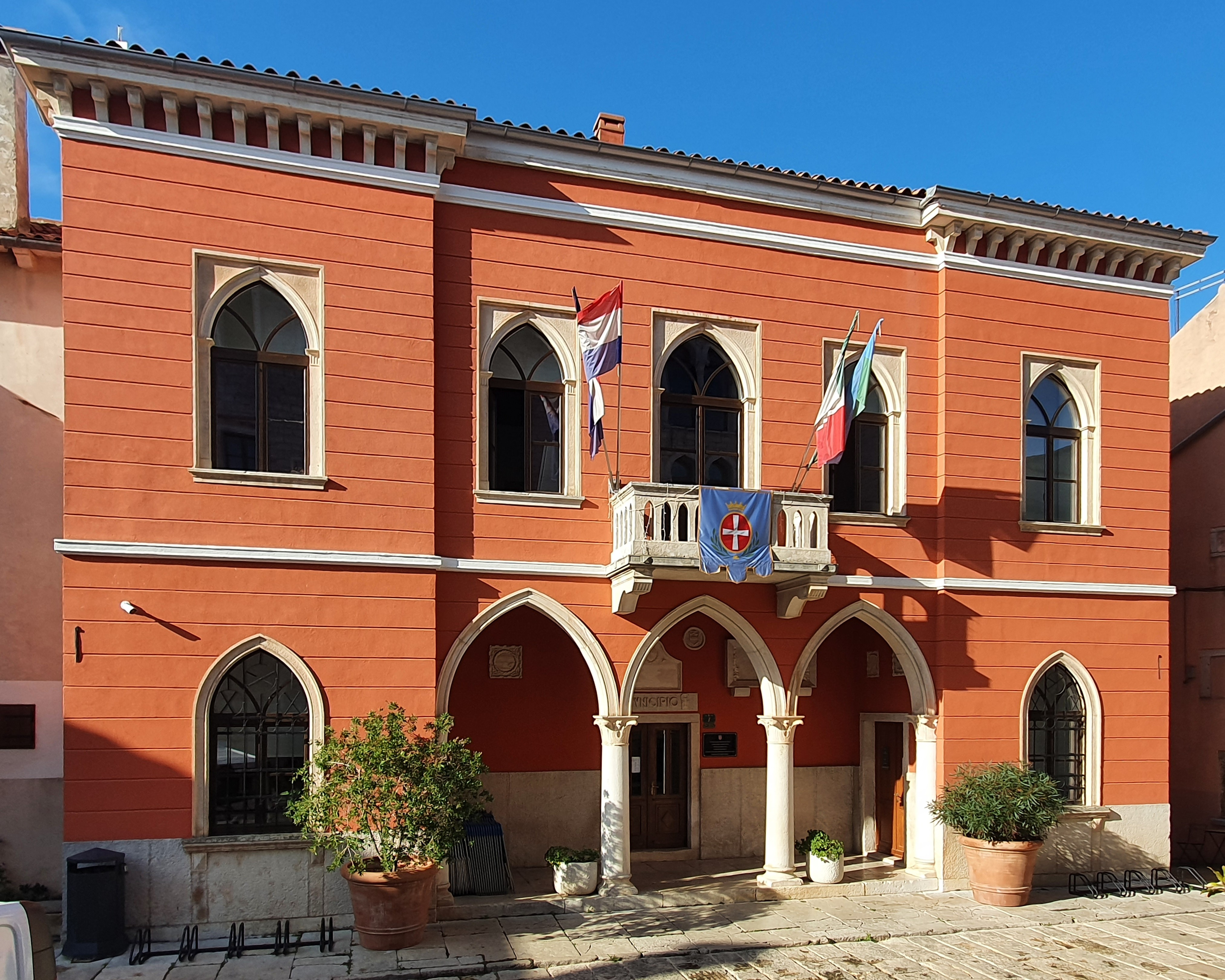
Town Hall

In order to perform executive tasks, the municipality is not elected by the municipality, but its duties are performed by the Municipal Council. The municipal council has a president, two vice presidents and consists of 11 members. The President of the Municipal Council performs the duty of the Municipal Mayor, and the duty of the Deputy Municipal Mayor is performed by the Vice-Presidents of the Municipal Council.

The day of the municipality is May 1, which is celebrated in honor of Blessed Julian, the patron saint of the municipality.

In the municipality of Bale, the official use of Croatian and the language of the Italian national minority and the Latin alphabet is equal, except in the towns of Čubani, Golaš, Krmed and Pižanovac. In the area of the municipality, all public inscriptions are displayed in Croatian and Italian. Although though the Government of the Republic of Croatia does not guarantee official Croatian-Italian bilinguialism, the statute of Bale/Valle itself does.

== Economy ==
Tourism is the main service activity.

== Monuments and landmarks ==
- Holy Spirit Church built in the 15th century.

The Soardo Bembo Palace is still the largest building in Bale. It was formed from two square defensive towers. At the turn of the 14th and 15th centuries, a residential part of the palace decorated with Gothic quadriphores was built between these two towers (until then connected by a bridge).

The first owners of the palace were from the Soardo family. Left without male heirs in 1618, Veronica Soardo married Alvise Bembo, making the palace the property of the Bembo family. Today the building has been renovated. It is mainly used by the Italian Community.

== Education ==
In schools with Croatian as the language of instruction, Italian is taught as the language of the social environment, and in schools with Italian as the language of instruction, Croatian is taught.

== Culture ==
The association of citizens "Stone Stories" operates in the place. In her organization, the "Last Minute Open Jazz Festival" takes place every summer in Bale:

- Organizer: Tomislav Pavleka
- Art director: prof. Ratko Zjača
- Producer and photographer: mr.sc. Gordan Topic, (alias Gordan Nia)

Also every year in the gallery Ulika is held an exhibition "Castrum Vallis", which is attended by many famous painters. The exhibition, in which academic artists, but also those without higher education, present their worldview, was started in 1964 by Vasilije Jordan, Dragica Cvek Jordan and Milan Cmelić, and was soon joined by Predrag Goll, a Slavonian who spends most of the year in Bale. At the beginning, the founders could not even dream of how many authors would participate in this project, and only this year there are 72. In none of their periods was the Castrum Vallis exhibition burdened with competition, but it was an ideal place for summer gatherings of artists. She synthesized traditions and wisdom, with reference to her own environment and the inspiration offered by the sun, sea, land and stone combined with spirit and emotion.

The Women's Klapa "Castrum Vallis" operates in Bale. The president of the klapa is Mrs. Jasna Volarević - Ibrić.

== Sport ==
- The following sports clubs operate in the municipality:
- NK Jedinstvo, football club
- Sport fishing society Colone 04,
- Hunting Society Jarebica,
- Women's handball club Bale,
- Budokai Club Lav,
- Bale Women's Volleyball Club.

There are two football fields.

== See also ==
- Barbariga, Croatia

== Bibliography ==
- Girardi Jurkić, Vesna (2009). "Interior Limes in Late Roman Istria (Croatia)". Limes XX: Estudios sobre la frontera romana [Limes XX: Studies on the Roman Frontier] (in Italian). Vol. 1. pp. 119–124. ISBN 978-84-00-08855-2.
- Jelinčić, Jakov; Uljančić-Vekić, Elena (2007-02-02). "Popis lokaliteta pastoralnih vizitacija porečkih biskupa u 17. i 18. stoljeću" [List of Locations of Pastoral Visitations of the Bishops of Poreč in the 17th and 18th Century]. Vjesnik istarskog arhiva (in Serbo-Croatian) (8–10): 107–174. ISSN 0353-7153.
