= Batumi Cathedral of the Mother of God =

Georgian Orthodox cathedral in Batumi, Georgia

Coordinates: 41.6500°N 41.6500°E

- ღვთისმშობლის სახელობის ეკლესია
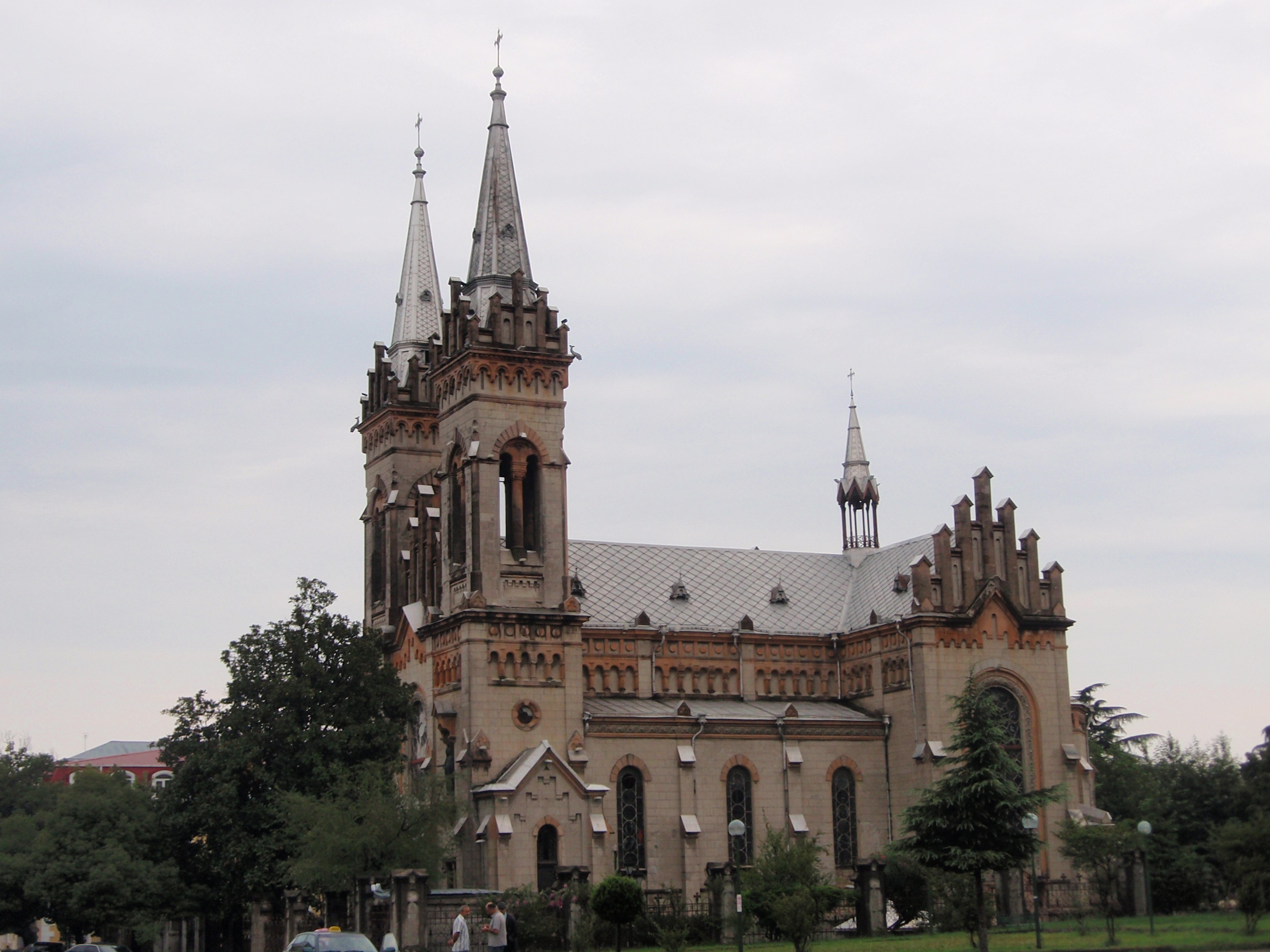

General information
- Type: Church
- Architectural style: Gothic Revival
- Location: Batumi, Georgia
- Construction started: 1898
- Completed: 1903
- Renovated: 1989
- Owner: Georgian Orthodox Church

Design and construction
- Architect: Aleksander Rogojski
- Main contractor: Zubalashvili brothers

The Church of the Mother of God (Georgian: ბათუმის ღვთისმშობლის სახელობის ეკლესია, batumis ghvtismshoblis sakhelobis eklesia, meaning "Batumi Church of the Virgin Mary") is a Georgian Orthodox cathedral in the city of Batumi, capital of the autonomous republic of Adjara, Georgia. Originally constructed as a Roman Catholic church between 1898 and 1903, it is a notable example of Gothic Revival architecture on Georgia's Black Sea coast.

The church was commissioned by the wealthy Zubalashvili brothers, prominent Georgian Catholic businessmen, and designed by Polish architect Aleksander Rogojski. Construction took place from 1898 to 1903.

During the Soviet era, the building was closed to worshippers and repurposed as a high-voltage laboratory. In 1989, amid the period of Perestroika and religious revival, the structure was transferred to the Georgian Orthodox Church.

Today, it serves as an active Orthodox cathedral. The Roman Catholic community in Batumi now worships at the Church of the Holy Spirit, a modern building consecrated in 2000.

== History ==
The cathedral was commissioned by the wealthy Zubalashvili brothers, prominent Georgian Catholic philanthropists and merchants, and designed by Polish architect Aleksander Rogojski. Construction began in 1898 and was completed in 1903.

Following the Soviet annexation of Georgia, the cathedral was closed in the 1930s as part of the state's anti-religious campaign. It was subsequently repurposed as a high-voltage physics laboratory for several decades.

In 1989, amid the Perestroika reforms and revival of religious life in Georgia, the building was transferred to the Georgian Orthodox Church. Since then, it has served as the main Orthodox cathedral in Batumi and the seat of the local bishop.

== Architecture ==
The Church of the Mother of God is designed in the Gothic Revival style, a movement that was popular in Europe during the late 19th and early 20th centuries. The structure features pointed arches, tall spires, and elaborate stone carvings typical of the style.

The exterior is built of light-colored stone, with two symmetrical towers flanking the main entrance. Each tower is topped with a steeply pitched spire, and the façades are decorated with carved reliefs and ornamental detailing. Large stained glass windows allow natural light to filter into the interior, creating a vivid interplay of color and shadow.

Inside, the cathedral has a single nave with rib-vaulted ceilings, reflecting traditional Gothic spatial proportions. Although the original Catholic interior was altered after its transfer to the Georgian Orthodox Church in 1989, several elements, such as the tall lancet windows and stone tracery, have been preserved. The current Orthodox interior features an iconostasis adorned with gilded icons and frescoes depicting scenes from the life of the Virgin Mary.

The building's location near the Black Sea coast exposes it to a humid maritime climate, which has necessitated periodic restoration work to preserve both its structural integrity and decorative elements.

== Current use ==
Today, the Cathedral of the Mother of God functions as the principal Georgian Orthodox cathedral in Batumi. It serves as the seat of the Georgian Orthodox bishop of Batumi and Lazeti and hosts regular liturgical services, including the Divine Liturgy, baptisms, and weddings.

The cathedral also plays a central role in major religious celebrations in Adjara, particularly the feasts dedicated to the Virgin Mary, which attract large numbers of local worshippers and visitors from other regions of Georgia.

Beyond its religious function, the cathedral is one of the most visited landmarks in Batumi, featuring prominently in city walking tours and cultural itineraries. The building remains a symbol of the city's architectural heritage and religious revival in the post-Soviet era.

== Gallery ==
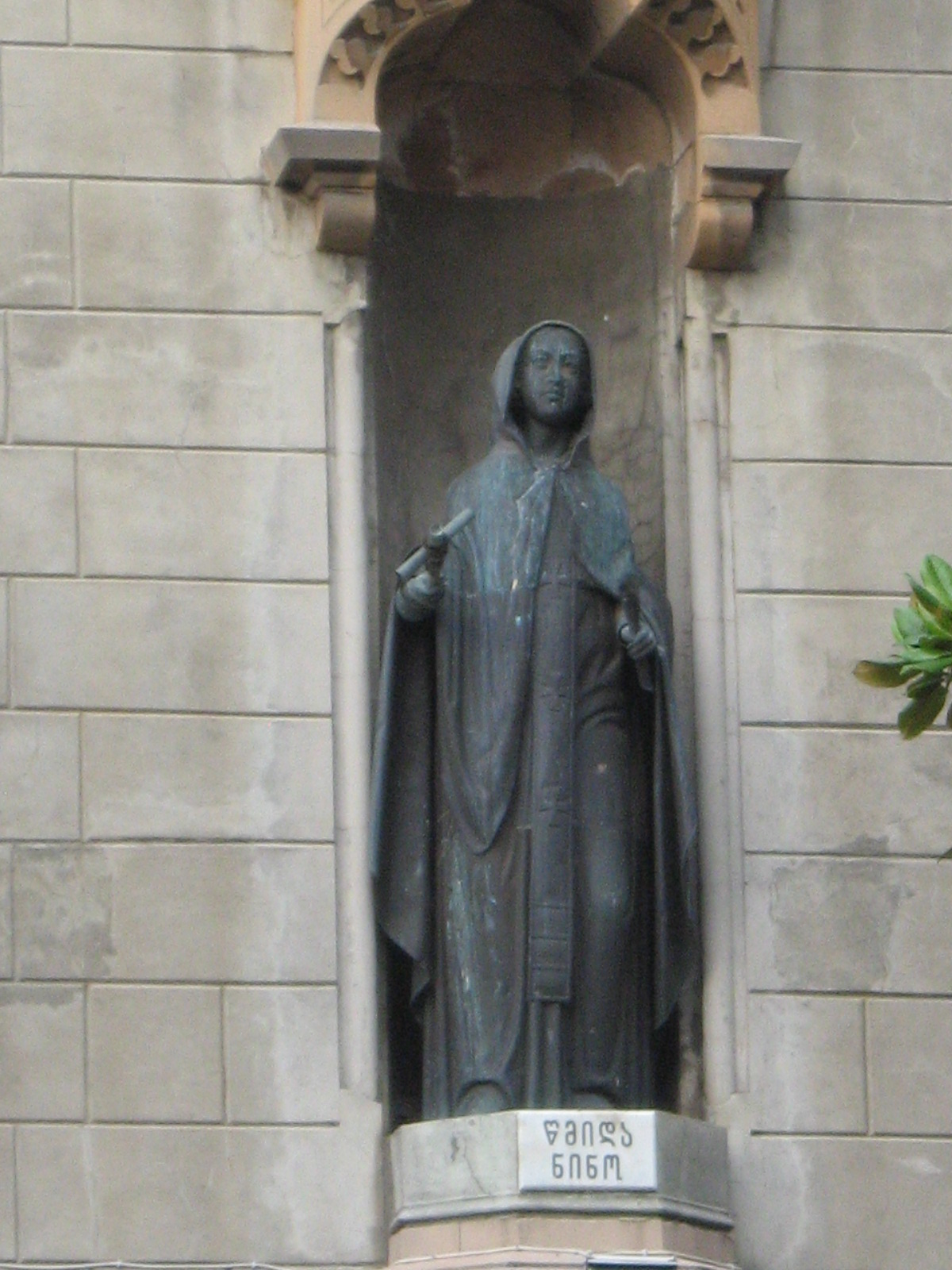

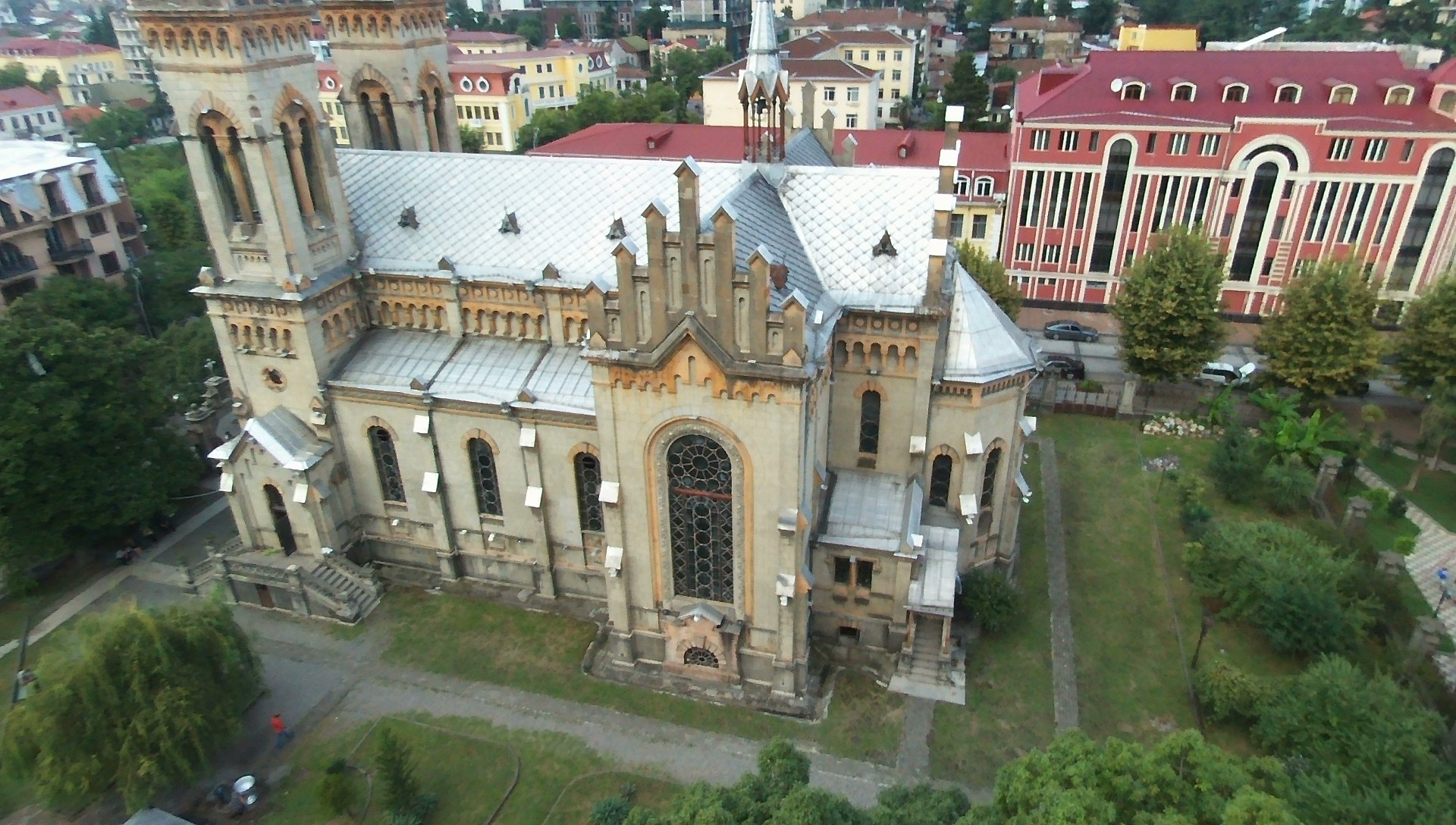

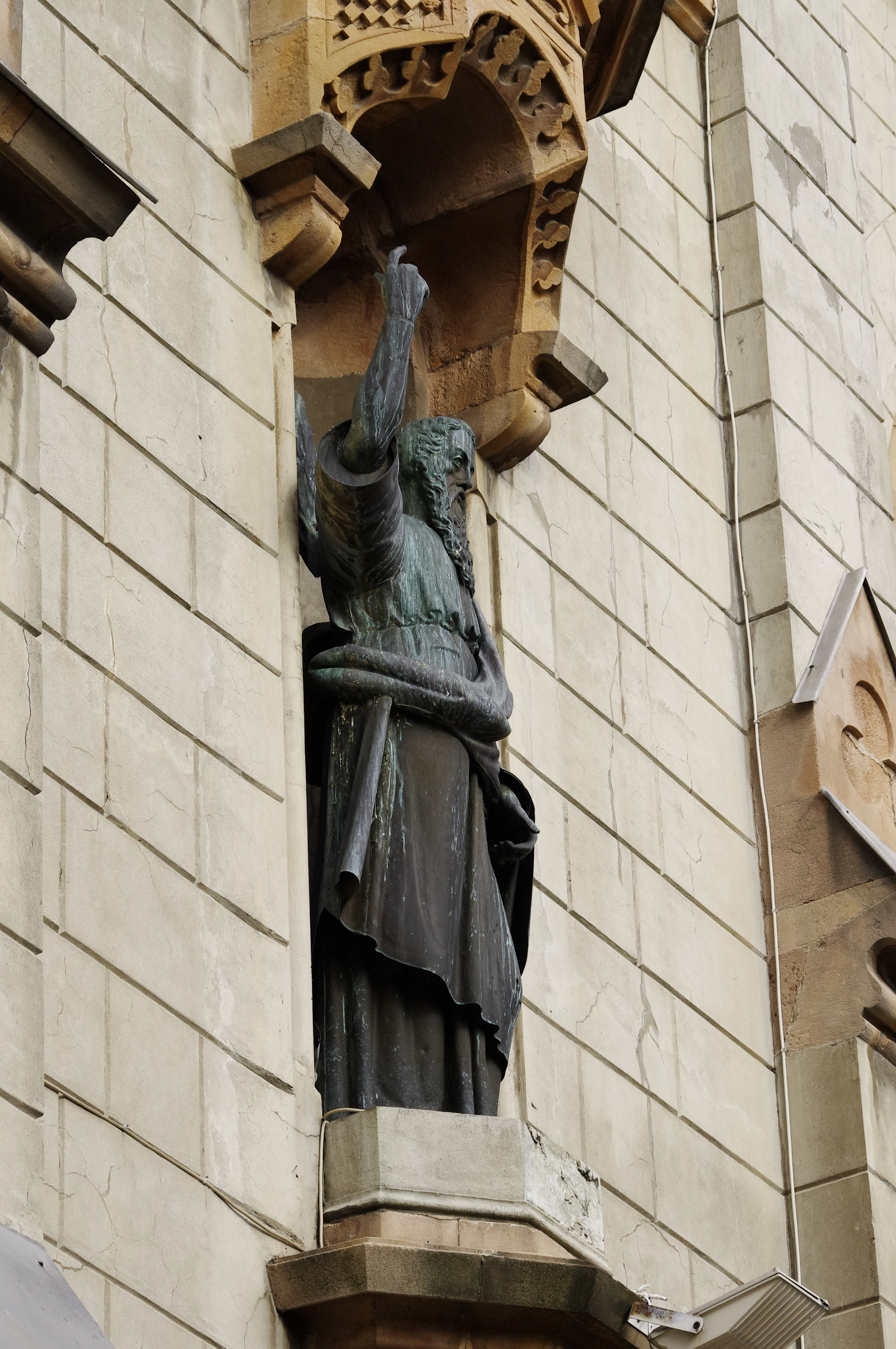

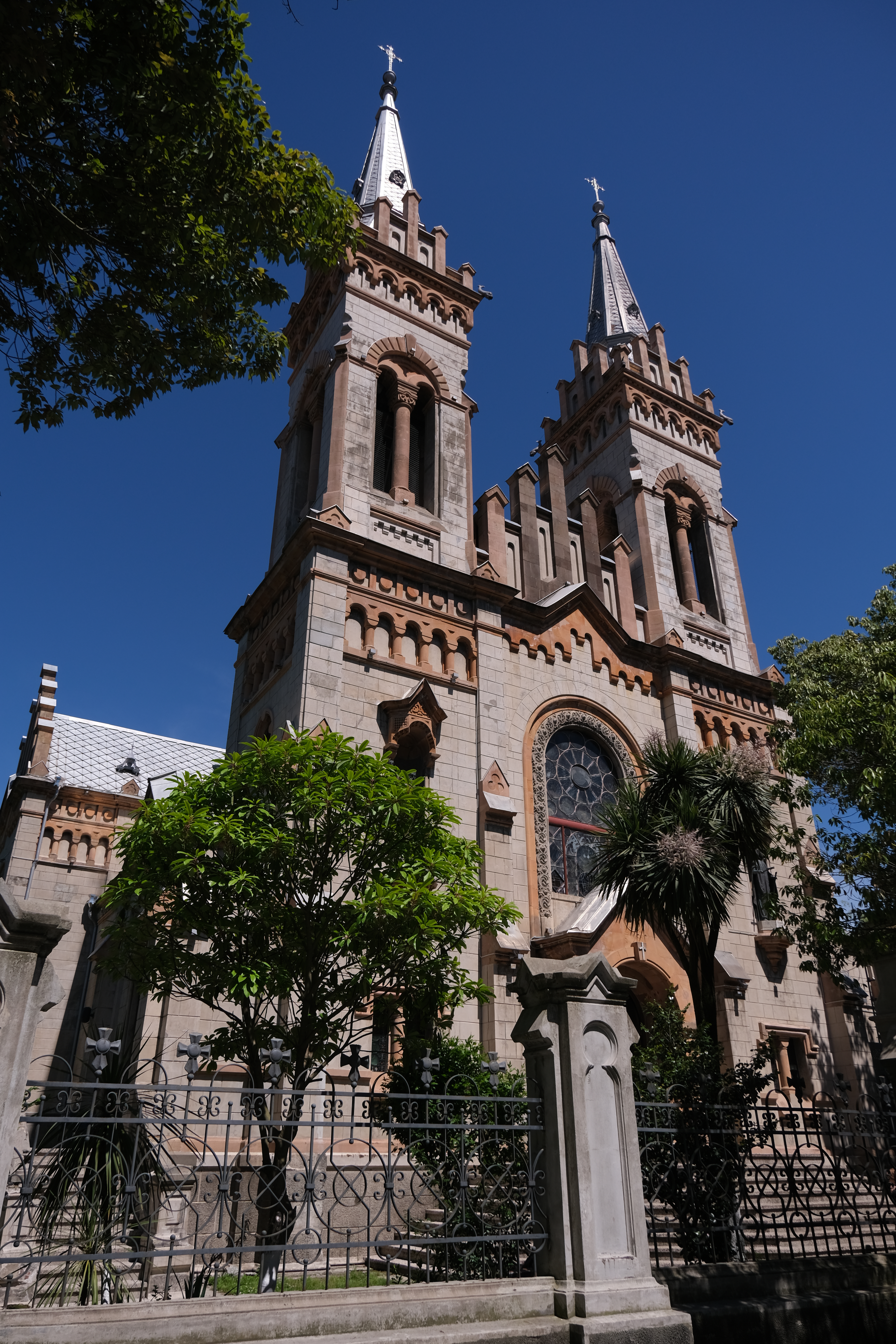
