= Church of the Holy Spirit, Prague =

Gothic church in Prague, Czech Republic

Coordinates: 50°5′24″N 14°25′13″E

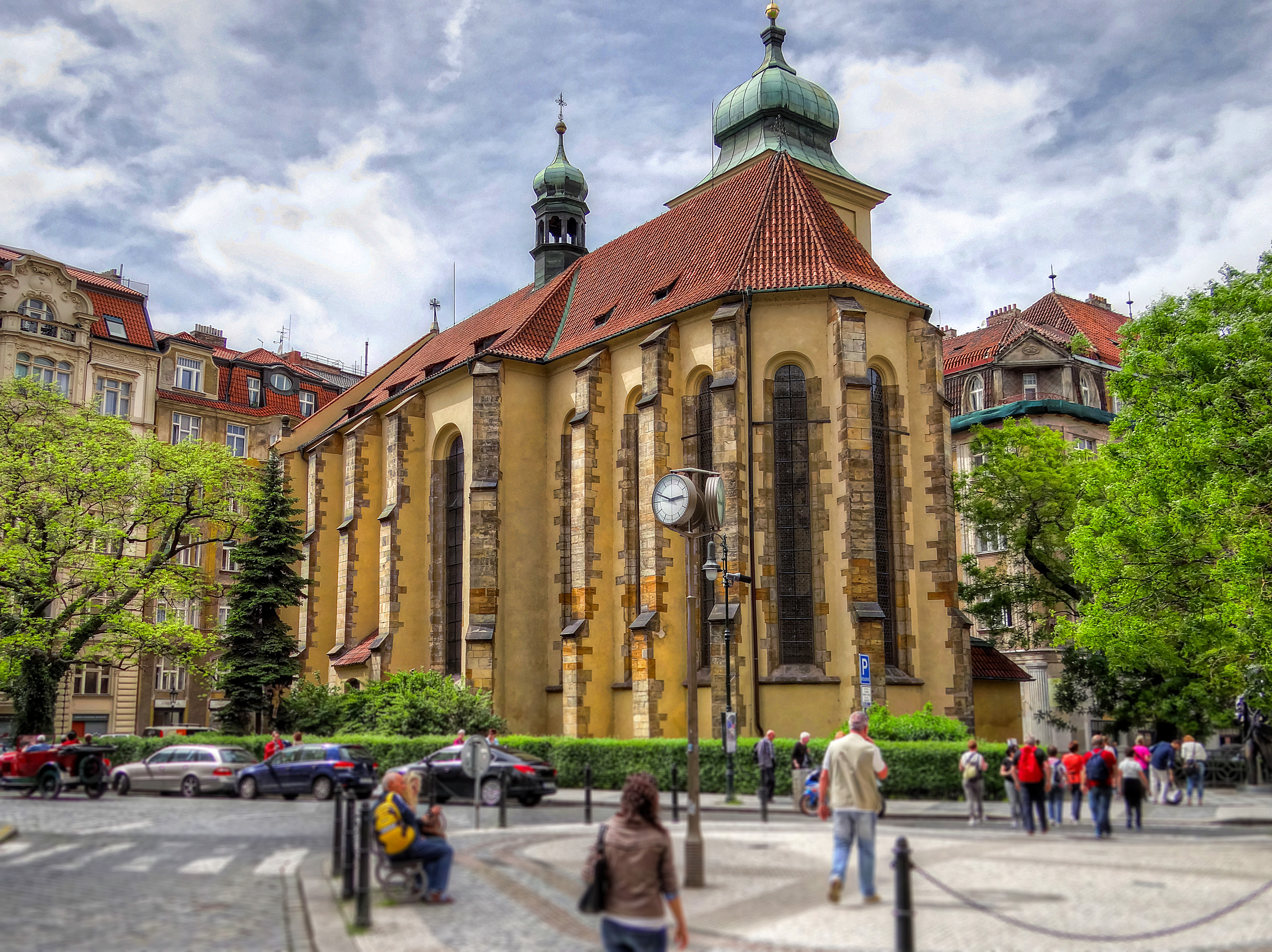
Church of the Holy Spirit

Church of the Holy Spirit (Czech: Kostel svatého Ducha) is a Gothic church in Josefov, Prague, Czech Republic.
