= Holy Ghost Mission (Bagamoyo) =

Roman Catholic mission in Africa

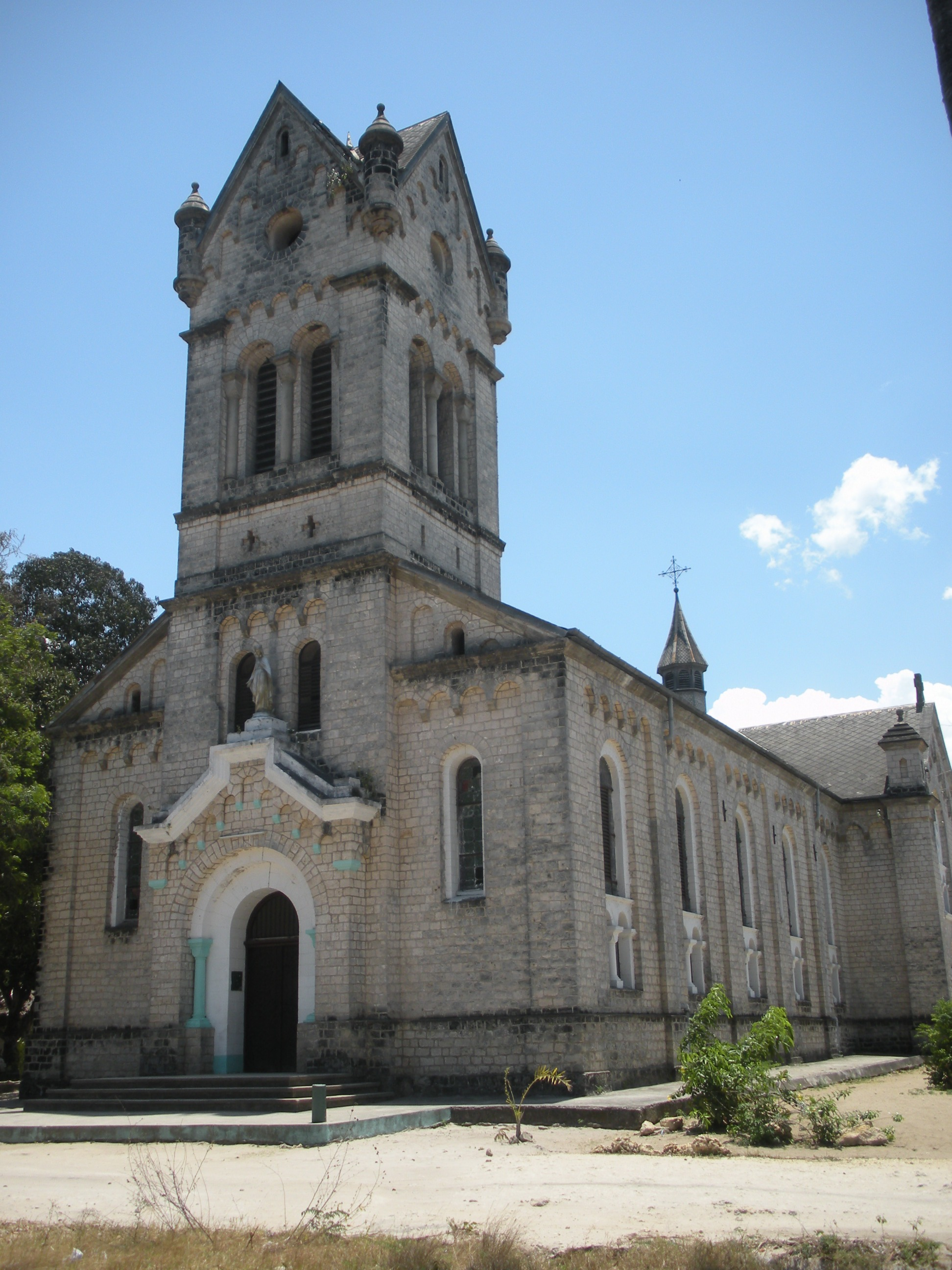
Holy Ghost Church (built 1872).

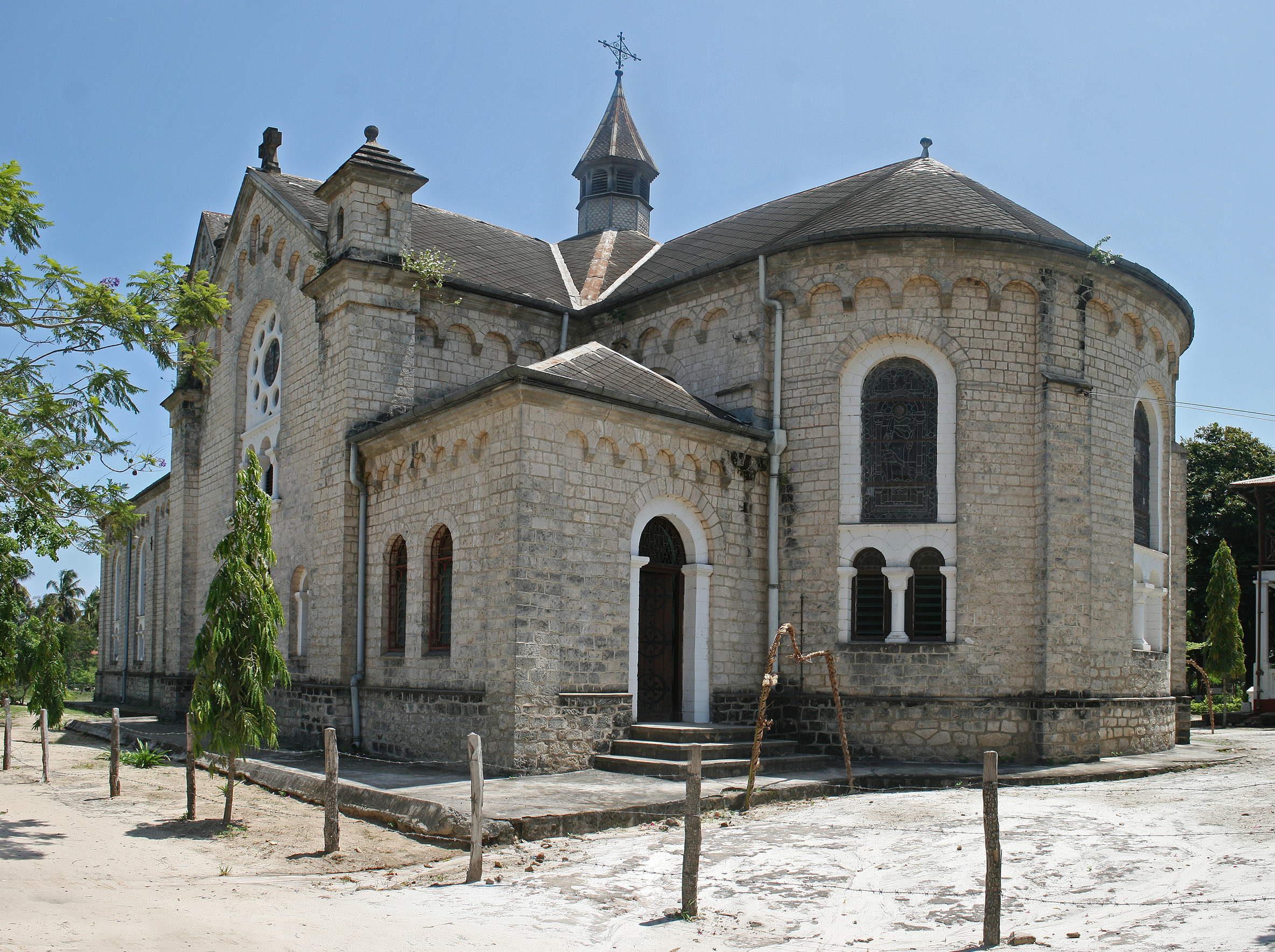
Holy Ghost Church (built 1910)

Holy Ghost Mission is located in Bagamoyo, Tanzania. The pioneer mission was established by the Holy Ghost Fathers. The original Holy Ghost Church, built in 1872, is reportedly the oldest church on the mainland of East Africa, while the new church was built 1910–1914. In 1874, David Livingstone was interred for a night at the Holy Ghost Mission; the Livingstone Tower, a part of the original church, is named in his honor.

There are several other buildings on the mission grounds, including the Old Fathers' House, which was the residence for the missionaries. The three-storey building features a wide balcony and is built in pre-colonial mission style. The grounds also include a cemetery, a grotto (built in 1876), and a museum. The missionary complex is located 2 kilometres (1.2 mi) to the north of the Bagamoyo town.

== History ==
In 1868, Father Antoine Horner of the Holy Ghost Fathers who was looking for a location in the main land of East Africa to establish the first Roman Catholic mission came to Bagamoyo and decided to establish the mission here. At that time itself it was cosmopolitan town with its local ethnic groups and also people from Arabia, India, Muslim countries, Parsees, Goa and Europe. It was a trade centre and was well known for its slave trade. The land required for the mission was gifted by Muslims under the leadership of Sultan Majid in 1868 itself.

Soon thereafter, the first church was built in 1872, after establishing the mission, as a simple towered structure of French design but with local materials. With its many arches and pinnacles, the tower resembles a mitre. This "squat tower" has since been renamed as Livingston tower. Father's residence (a triple storied building with wide balcony) was also built at the time in the local style with mangrove wood floor and roof, and coral stone walls of a precolonial style of architecture. It has open arches on its periphery and has no resemblance to the German colonial architecture. The Sisters' Convent was also built in the same style. During this time cholera epidemic had also affected the town and people took refuge in the mission complex. The objective of the French Missionaries, who founded the mission here, was to free slaves from their bonded labour, which though initially had limited success but generated awareness to further the cause of an Awareness Movement of the east African Slave Trade.

In 1892, another large gift of land of 20,000 hectares (49,000 acres) was made to the mission by Sewa Haji, the Muslim philanthropist and a very rich trader (who traded in cloth, copper, gunpowder, ivory and rhino horn and who also owned and arranged caravans). This enabled the mission to enlarge its building complex. In 1910–14, before World War I, a bigger Romanesque church, named the New Holy Ghost Church, was built with dressed coral stone blocks.

A cemetery was also established about 100 metres (330 ft) away from the main mission building where early missionaries are buried. A grotto was built by the "emancipated slaves" who lived in the mission. There are also some exotic trees in the grounds of the mission which were planted early during the missionaries began their mission.

== Museum ==
The Sisters’ House, built in 1876, was converted into the Roman Catholic Mission Museum. The museum has many sentimentally touching exhibits of photographs of slaves tied together with chains to their necks, exhibits of the history of Missionary work and conversion to Christianity, books and booklets on prehistory of Bagamoyo, Indian and Arab door frames, and shackles, chains and whips used during slave trade, and many local wood crafts.

== Other notable features ==
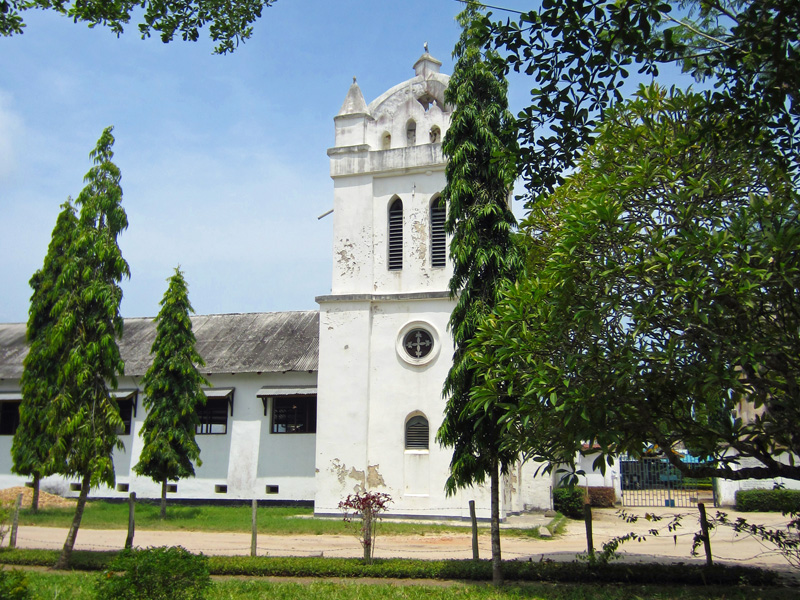
Livingstone Tower of the old church.

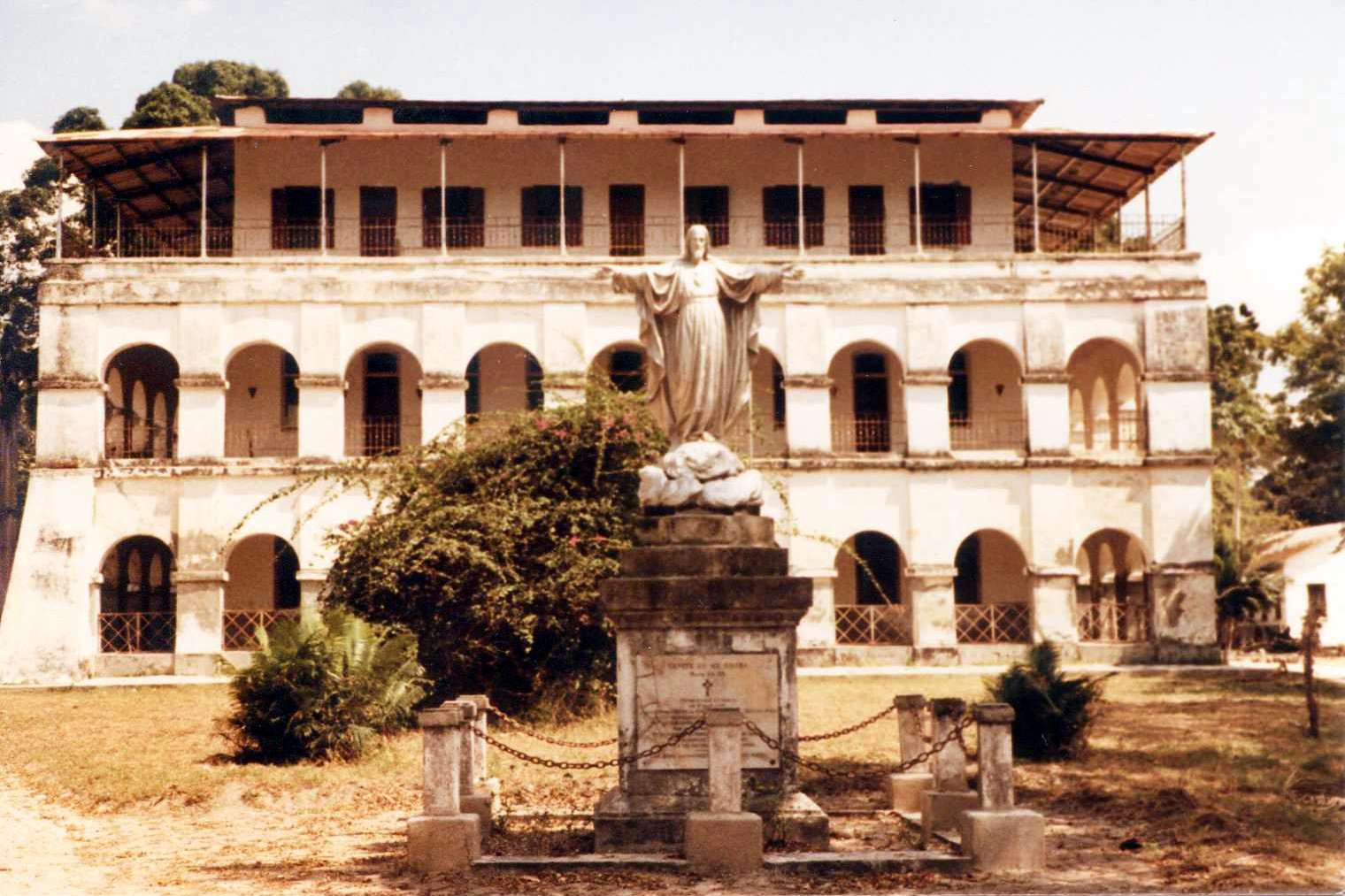
The Catholic mission building.

When David Livingstone the legendary explorer died during the exploration campaign, his dead body was carried by his devoted servants, Abdullak Susi and James Chuma. They carried his emaciated body (without the heart which had been buried in Zambia) on a journey from Chitamaho in Zambia to Bagmayo which lasted over a period of 11 months. His body was kept in the tower (which is named after him now) on 24 February 1874 for one night and the next day it was taken on the ship ironically named MS Vulture to Zanzibar and then to England where he was buried in Westminster Abbey. 700 slave gathered to pay homage to him at the church before the "Mwili wa Daudi" - "the Body of David" was taken to England.

An object of note attached to the Boab tree in the churchyard is a small piece of iron chain. It is said that a young French Missionary, Madam Chevalier, who was running a dispensary in Zanzibar, had fastened a chain to the tree to tie her donkey, and eventually forgot about it. Over the centuries the tree has grown to an enormous size of 7 metres (23 ft) diameter leaving out the chain as a small piece of 1 foot (0.30 m) of the chain.
