= Holy Spirit Church, Valga =

Church building in Estonia

Holy Spirit Church
- Pühavaimu kirik
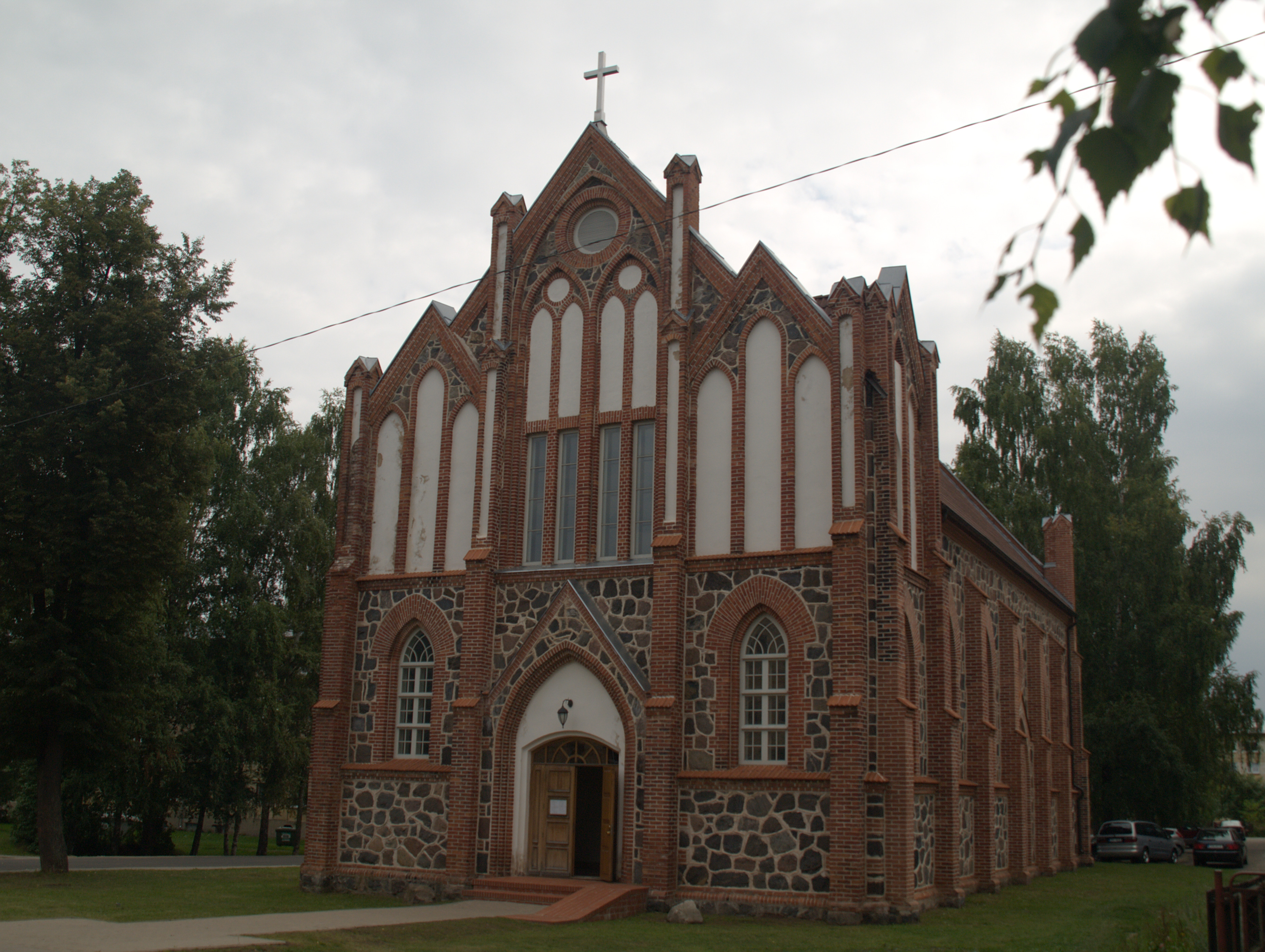

- Location within Estonia
- 57°46′38″N 26°3′17″E
- Location: Valga
- Country: Estonia
- Denomination: Roman Catholic Church

The Holy Spirit Church (Estonian: Pühavaimu kirik) is the name given to a religious building belonging to the Catholic Church and located on 8th Street Malev, Valga in Estonia. The church has been classified as cultural and heritage monument, so it is protected.

It is a neo-Gothic building which was built in granite and brick and decorated with red bricks. Builders were among railroad workers from Lithuania and Poland. The church was completed in 1907. The tower was not completed because the authorities did not give permission to build.

The church operated until 1940. Since 1945, the building was used as a warehouse and later as a gym. In 1995 an extension and remodeling was completed, and was again used as a place of worship.

Because of the diversity of nationalities that make up the congregation offer Masses in Estonian and Russian, on Saturdays and Sundays and Catholic holidays.

== See also ==
- Roman Catholicism in Estonia
