= Church of the Holy Spirit, Vilnius =

Church of the Holy Spirit, Vilnius might refer to:

- Orthodox Church of the Holy Spirit, Vilnius
- Roman Catholic Church of the Holy Spirit, Vilnius
