= Church of the Holy Spirit (Batumi) =

Coordinates: 41.6456°N 41.6499°E

- სულიწმიდის კათოლიკური ეკლესია
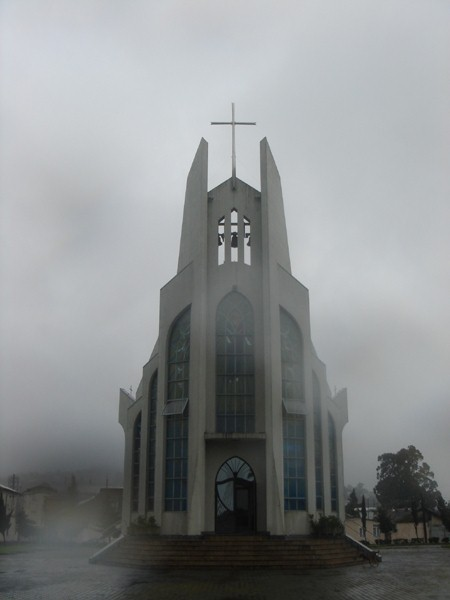
- Interactive map of the Church of the Holy Spirit area

General information
- Type: Church
- Location: Batumi, Georgia
- Inaugurated: 2000
- Owner: Catholic Church

Design and construction
- Architects: Oleg Pataridze and Giorgi Baghoshvili

The Church of the Holy Spirit (Georgian: სულიწმიდის კათოლიკური ეკლესია) is a Roman Catholic church in the Black Sea city of Batumi, Georgia’s autonomous republic of Adjara. It was constructed in the late 1990s by the Georgian architects Oleg Pataridze and Giorgi Baghoshvili and consecrated in 2000.

The building replaced the earlier church which was confiscated by communists during the Soviet occupation but since 1989 serves as the Georgian Orthodox Cathedral of the Mother of God.
