= Church of the Holy Spirit, Lund =

Coordinates: 55°41′37.5″N 13°10′45″E

Church of the Holy Spirit
- Helgeandskyrkan
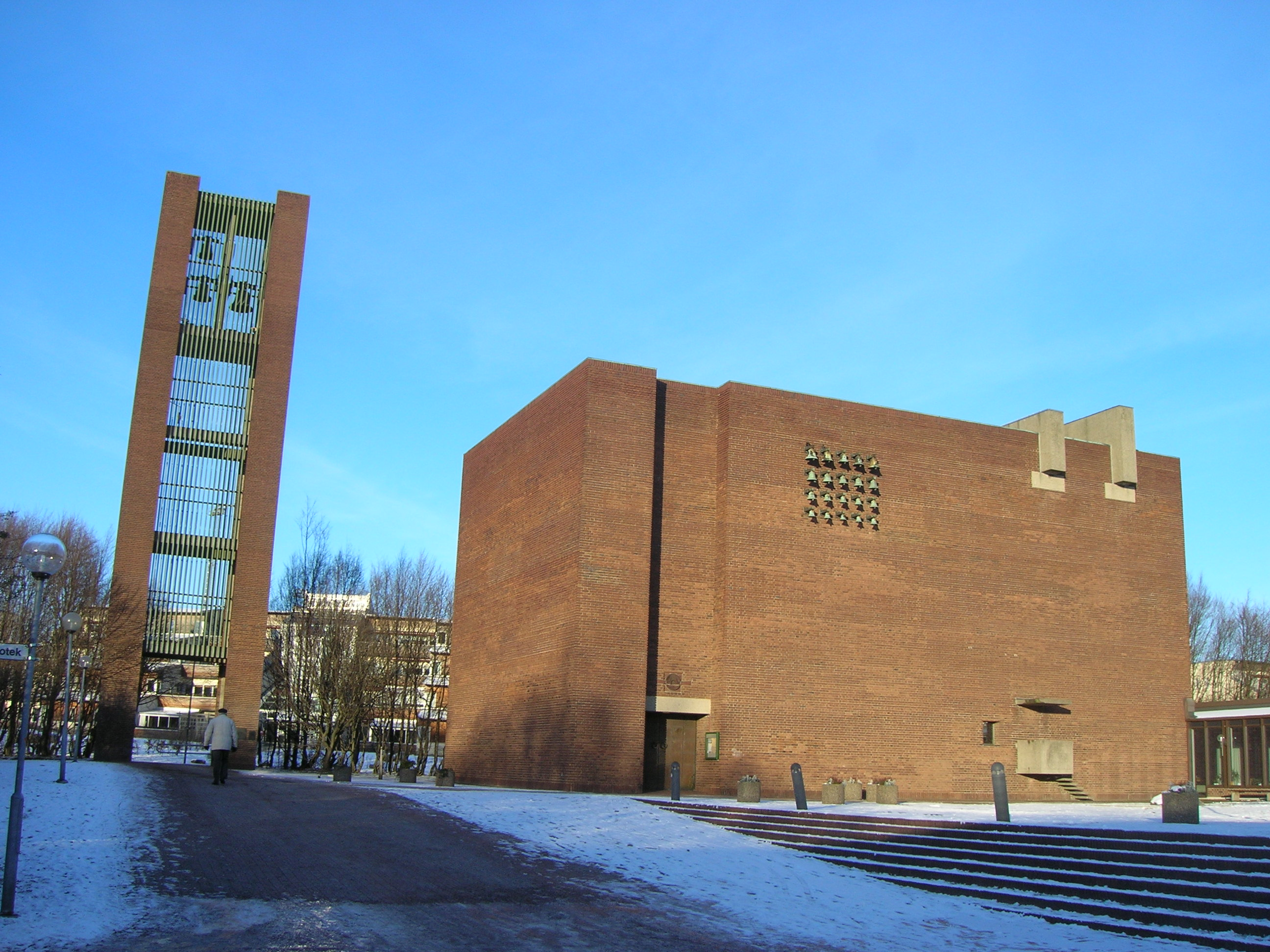
- The church in January 2007
- Church of the Holy Spirit
- Location: Lund
- Country: Sweden
- Denomination: Church of Sweden

History
- Consecrated: 1968

Administration
- Diocese: Lund
- Parish: Holy Spirit

The Church of the Holy Spirit (Swedish: Helgeandskyrkan) is a church located in the district of Klostergården, on the south-west side of Lund in Skåne, Sweden. It was opened in 1968 as a district church in the Diocese of Lund, but became the main church of the parish of Helgeand after it was formed in 1991.

The functionalistic church has thick brick walls, a campanile and a pulpit on the exterior designed for outdoor services. It has 23 church bells, of which twenty form a chime of bells and three are located in the campanile.

The architect behind the church was Sten Samuelson (1926-2002).

== Other sources ==
- Ahlberg, Bo, Queckfeldt, Eva & Übelacker, Walter (2008) Helgeandskyrkan - Helgeands församling i Lund - framväxt och utveckling ( Lund: Arcus) ISBN 9789188553171
