= Holy Spirit Church, Bale =

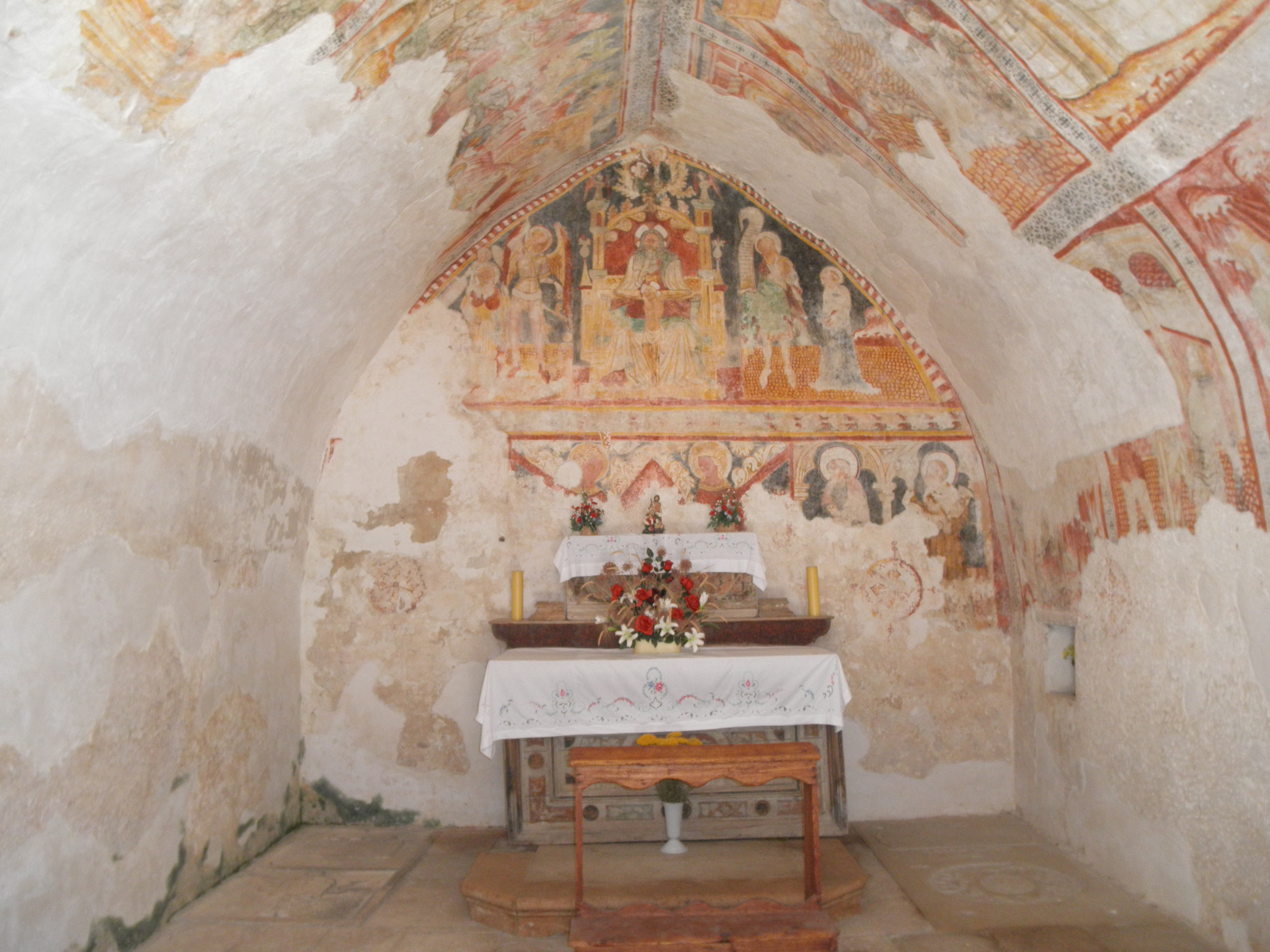
- Interior of the Holy Spirit church in Bale

- Location in Istria
- 45.040269°N 13.786457°E
- Location: Bale, Istria
- Country: Croatia

History
- Founded: 15th century

Architecture
- Functional status: Active

Holy Spirit Church is a small church in Bale, a small hilltop town in the inland of Istrian peninsula in north-western Croatia. The church is remarkable for its colourful frescoes on the ceiling and walls.

== History ==
The little church of Holy Spirit was built in the 15th century.

== Interior ==
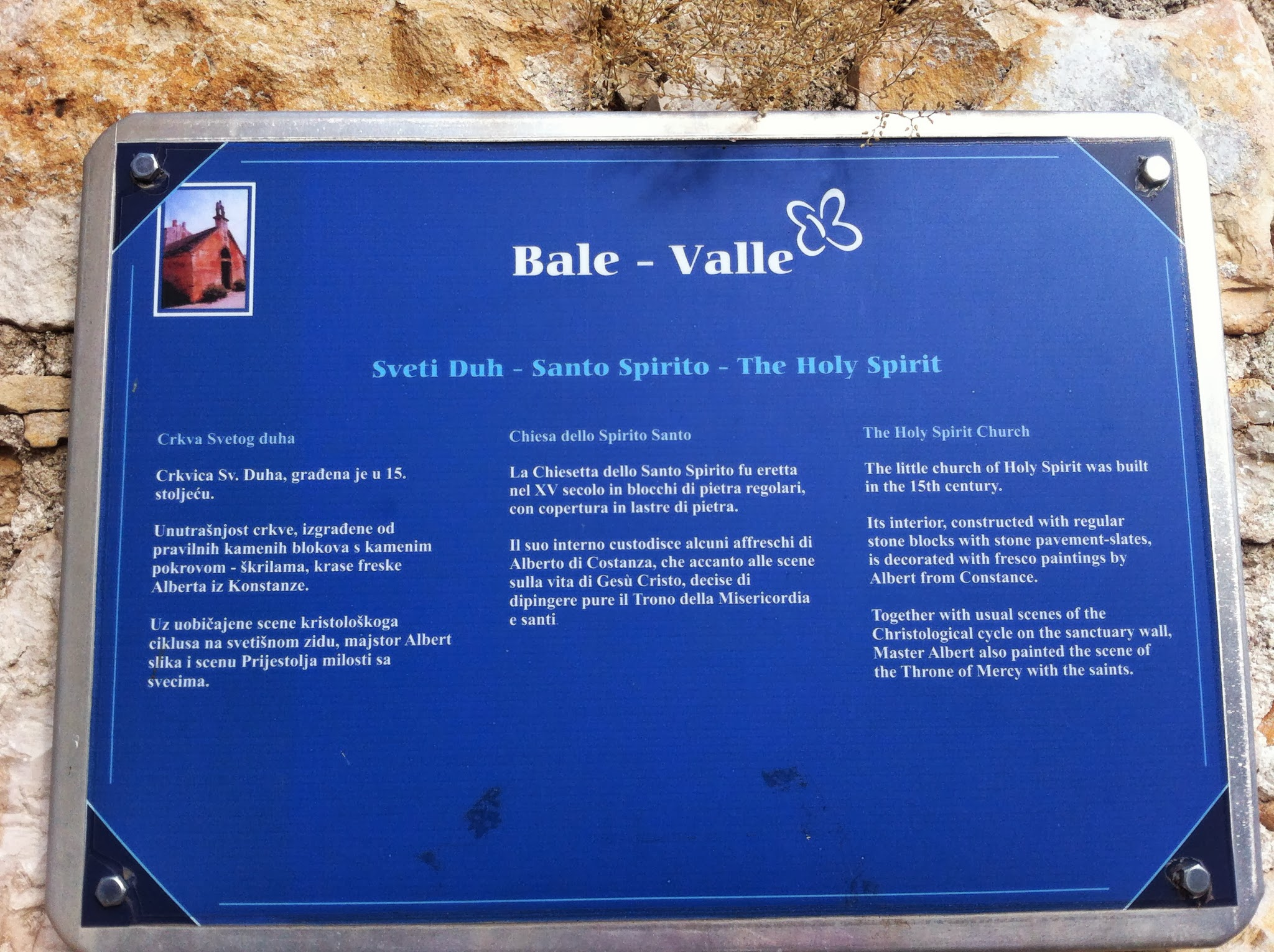
Sign at the entrance of the church

Its interior, constructed with regular stone blocks with stone pavement-slates, is decorated with fresco paintings by Albert from Constance. Together with usual scenes of the Christological cycle on the sanctuary side walls, Albert also painted the scene of the Throne of Mercy with the saints on the wall above the altar. The frescoes at the entrance of the church depict angels and hell.
