= Church of the Holy Spirit, Warsaw =

Church of the Holy Spirit
- Kościół Św. Ducha
- Church of the Holy Spirit from Freta Street
- Church of the Holy Spirit
- 52.250556°N 21.009167°E
- Location: Warsaw
- Country: Poland
- Denomination: Roman Catholic

History
- Dedication: The Holy Spirit

Architecture
- Architect(s): Józef Piola; Józef Szymon Bellotti
- Style: Baroque
- Completed: 1707-1717

Administration
- Archdiocese: Warsaw
- Deanery: Śródmieście

Clergy
- Pastor: Marek Tomczyk

Historic Monument of Poland
- Designated: 1994-09-08
- Part of: Warsaw – historic city center with the Royal Route and Wilanów
- Reference no.: M.P. 1994 nr 50 poz. 423

The Church of the Holy Spirit (Polish: Kościół Św. Ducha) is a church at 3 Długa Street, in Warsaw's New Town.

The church was originally built in the Gothic style alongside a hospital in the 14th century. It was probably the first hospital of this type in the Mazovian region and was located just outside the walls of the Warsaw Old Town.

It was founded by Janusz the Elder, Duke of Warsaw, and handed over to the city in 1388.

== History ==
With the existing small church of the Holy Spirit, the citizens of Warsaw demanded a new hospital and it was set up for this purpose supposedly by Mikołaj Panczatka, who donated the church his property. From 1425 it was a hostel for the poor and in 1473 a chapel, temporary accommodation for guests or pilgrims, and a monastery were added. The parish priest was also the manager of the hospital at that time. The first pastor of the church, known by name, was Jędrzej Pronobis in 1473. Most of the funding received (from nobles and kings such as Sigismund I the Old and Bona Sforza) were given to the hospital.

Documents also mention parish priests: John Szeliga (1574), Wojciech Pruszczyński (1579) and Wojciech Badowski (1633). In 1629 the bishop of Poznań, Maciej Łubieński, placed it within the Holy Trinity parish (Parafia Świętej Trójcy na Solcu), and its buildings were completed, at the behest of the king, as part of the Birgittine Order.

In 1579, the brothers of the nearby church of St George were moved to the school at the Church of the Holy Spirit.

During the Swedish invasion (commonly referred to as The Deluge) the church fell into ruin and subsequently burnt down, but the magistrate's resolution from 1664 ensured that the hospital had an income. In 1665, in honour of the defence of Warsaw, the magistrate promised the priests of the Pauline order a new temple of worship.

In 1699 the foundation stone was laid for the new church, which was built from 1707 to 1717 in the Baroque style by architects Józef Piola and Józef Szymon Bellotti. A friend of King Augustus the Strong, the governor of Chełm Rybiński was invited for the ceremonial laying of the foundation stone, who set aside 40,000 Polish złotys for the building purposes. The construction of the church continued all the way until 1746, when the chapel, dedicated to Our Lady of Częstochowa, was finally completed.

In 1708, Warsaw suffered from an outbreak of the Great Northern War plague. During this time, the Pauline brothers were said to have organised the first pilgrimage from Warsaw to the Jasna Góra monastery in Częstochowa to pray to the Virgin Mary to save them from the disease. Ever since, the pilgrimage has become an important aspect of Polish culture and continues to this day.

By 1800 there were nine priests as well as two German professors and four students studying theology in the monastery.

In January 1807 the army of Napoléon Bonaparte used the monastery as army barracks. After the war, the monastery was briefly regained (the abbot at the time was Teodor Fortuński), however in 1819 the Tsarist administration ordered the priests to be removed from Warsaw to Częstochowa and that the church was to be administered by the German Brotherhood of St. Benno. Successive rectors were priests of German origin including Lüdicke, Amman, Gelderland, and Ballach.

In 1825 the monastery opened the main seminary as a theological faculty and later was transferred to the Franciscan Order. The remaining part of the monastery was rented as apartments.

After the January Uprising in 1863, a statue of the Virgin Mary by Czajkowski was placed in front of the church.

In 1944, during the infamous Warsaw Uprising, the church was almost completely destroyed by the German Army; the interior of the church and vaulting burnt down with only the main altar surviving.

In 1947, the Polish Primate Cardinal Hlond, returned the church to the administration of the Pauline Order and the church was rebuilt in 1956 in the same form as it was before World War II.

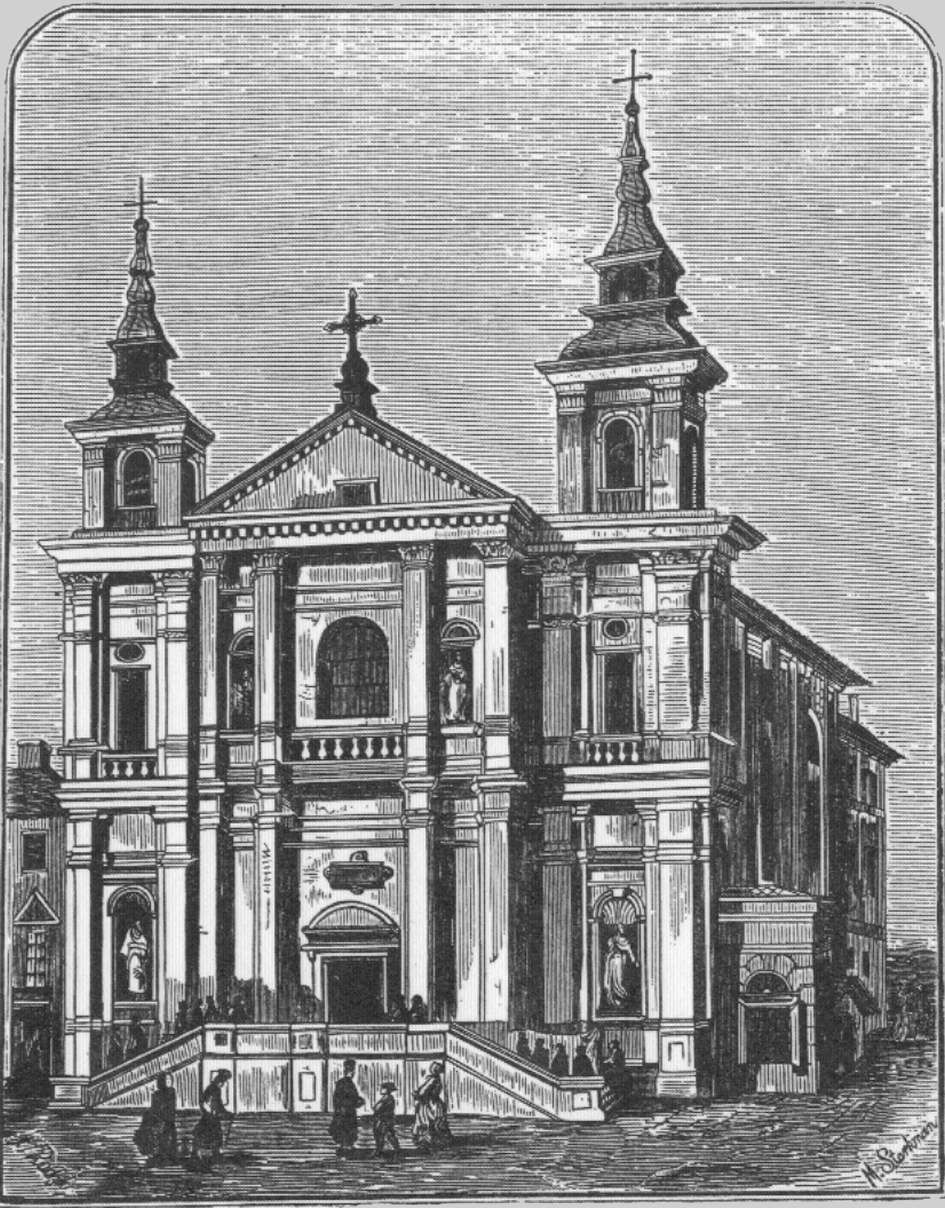
A Michał Starkman woodcut from around 1855

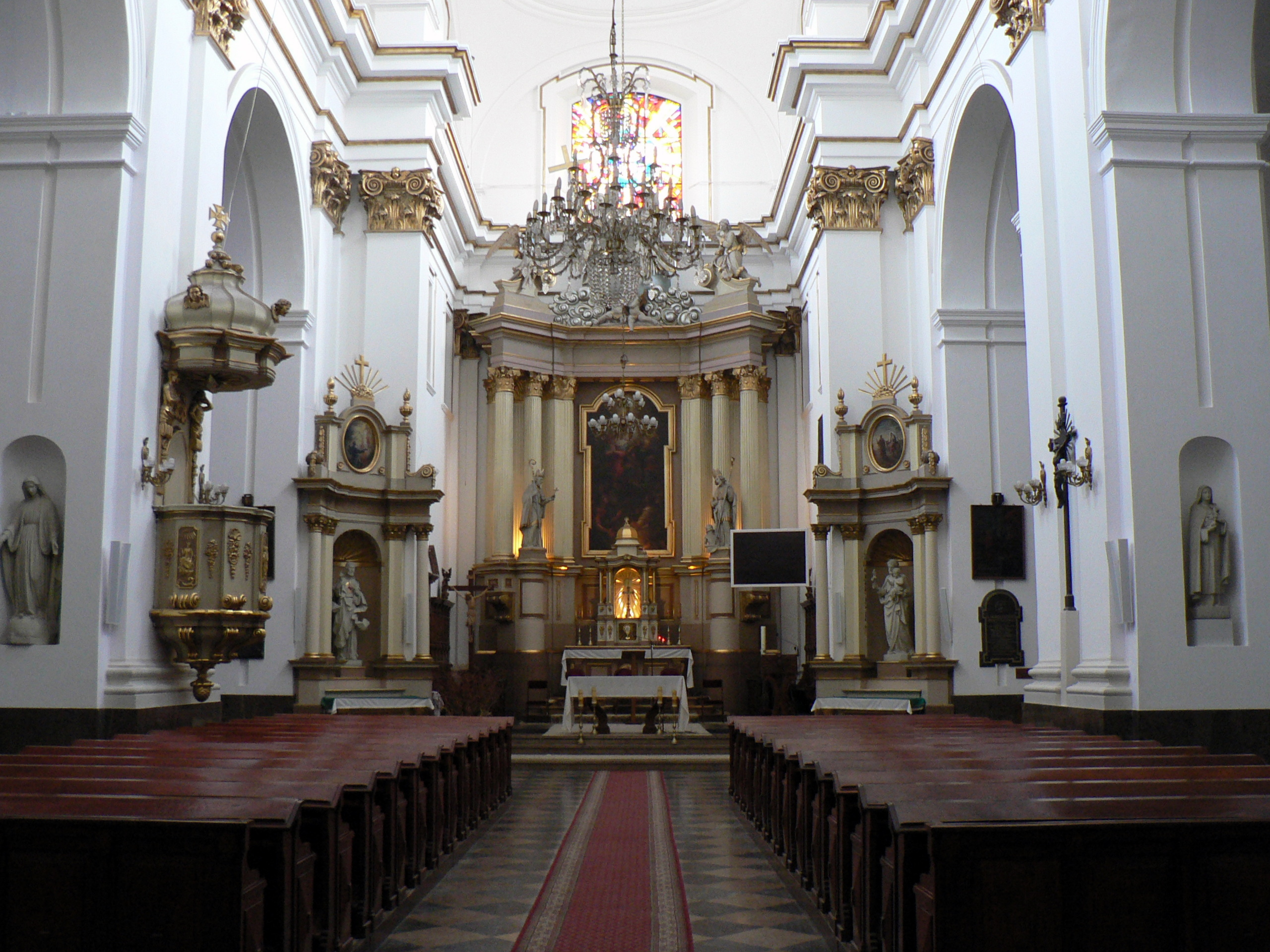
The church's interior

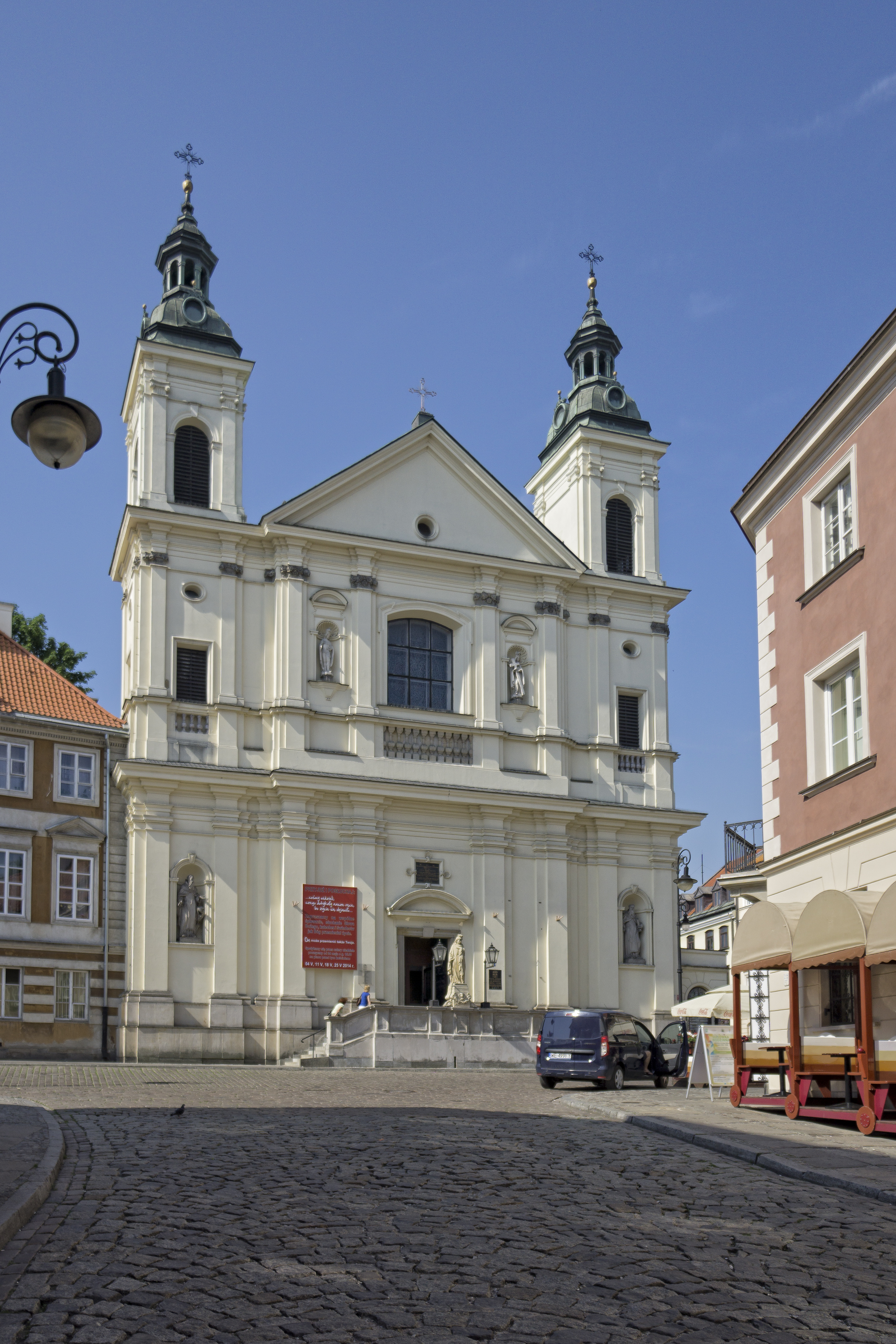
A view of the church from Mostowa Street
