= Holy Ghost Catholic Church (Denver) =

Historic Catholic church in Colorado, US

Coordinates: 39°44′53.1″N 104°59′16.6″W

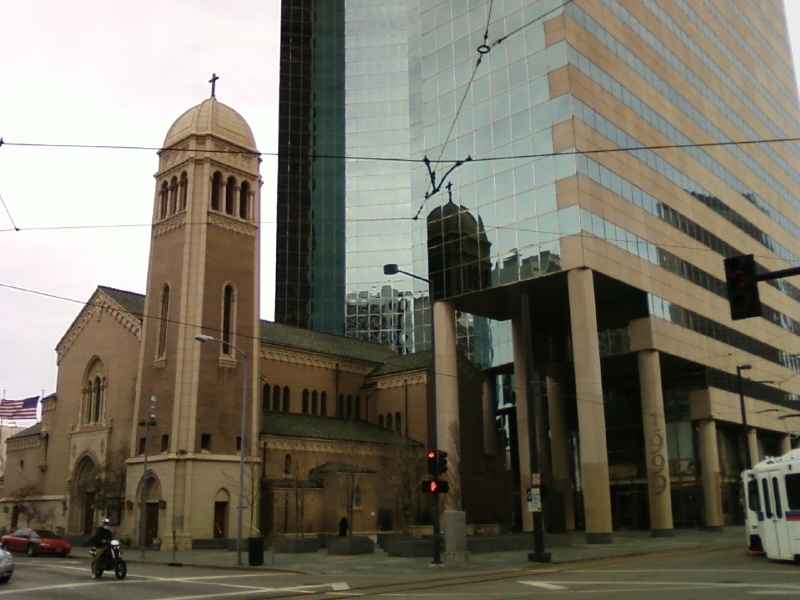
- Holy Ghost Catholic Church
- Location: 1900 California St., Denver, Colorado

History
- Consecrated: 08 July 1943

Architecture
- Architect: Jacques Benedict

Holy Ghost Catholic Church is a Catholic church at 1900 California Street in Denver, Colorado, United States. The church was consecrated in 1943. The architectural style is both Italian and Spanish, using locally sourced travertine marble, stained glass, and wood carvings.

In 1984, Fentress architects completed the 1999 Broadway tower, which rises 43 floors above the church.

The church is managed by the Oblates of the Virgin Mary on behalf of the Archbishop of Denver.
