= Holy Spirit Church (Stamford, Connecticut) =

Coordinates: 41°07′51.92″N 73°33′29.78″W

- Holy Spirit Church
- Location: 403 Scofieldtown Road; Stamford, Connecticut
- Country: United States
- Denomination: Roman Catholic

Architecture
- Architect: Antinozzi Associates

Administration
- Province: Hartford
- Diocese: Bridgeport

Clergy
- Bishop: Most Rev. Frank J. Caggiano
- Pastor: Fr. Luke Suarez

The Church of the Holy Spirit is a Roman Catholic parish in Stamford, Connecticut, part of the Diocese of Bridgeport.

== History ==
The modern church with some Romanesque features was designed by Antinozzi Associates of Bridgeport, CT.
