= Holy Spirit Church, Nandakhal =

- Holy Ghost Church, Nandakhal
- 19.439175°N 72.783334°E
- Location: Bassein, India
- Country: India
- Denomination: Roman Catholic (Latin rite)
- Website: www.youtube.com/channel/UCzsg5qyad3LP_ayhLk3CiMQ

History
- Founded: 1573
- Founder: Portuguese
- Dedication: Holy Spirit

Administration
- District: Palghar
- Diocese: Vasai (Bassein)
- Parish: Nandakhal

Clergy
- Bishop: Archbishop Felix Machado

Holy Spirit Church, Nandakhal is a historic Roman Catholic Church in Vasai (Bassein), Maharashtra, India. This church was built in 1573 by Portuguese Missionaries.

== History ==
=== 16th century ===
Nandakhal Church built in 1573, is the only church dedicated to the Holy Ghost(Spirit) in Vasai (Bassein) Diocese. Many devotees adopted Christianity during Vasai's life under the leadership of Francis Xavier and Fr. Antonio Ro Polo. Therefore, there was a need for a church outside the Bassein fort. Franciscan, Dominican, and the subsequent Jesus Union Mission, built nine churches outside the fort. In 1558, the Holy Cross Church in Nirmal and the Mother of Light was built in Agashi in 1568.

AD After 1558, there was a large conversion in the Nandakhal area of Bassein from Hinduism to Christianity. Earlier, devotees were going to Nirmal Church for the worship of the devotees here. After recognizing the spiritual need of the devotees of Nandakhal, Franciscan missionaries set up a grand church for that area in 1573. In 1585 Fr. Amodar Ana and Fr. Pauladi Potticulla were the first to be appointed to the priests of the Franciscan. Meanwhile, priest of Nirmal was taking care of the activities. Born in the early seventeenth century Vasai's first patron, Fr. Gonsalo Concesao, has worked hard in his church. Before that, Nirmal church priest looked after this new church. And they dedicated this Church to the Holy Spirit. Until the church was complete, devotees used to go to Nirmal Church for the prayers.

=== 18th century ===
In the attacks of Marathas between 1737 and 1739, most of the churches in Vasai collapsed. Nandakhal Church was fortunately safe in this attack. That is why the Nandakhal church is the oldest of all the churches in North Vasai and it stands in the original form. Prior to 1739, the administrator of the Franciscan was managing all the affairs. The religious leaders (priests) who came from Goa after the Maratha invasion are now managing all the affairs.

=== Early 20th century ===
When the church was cared for and renewed, the church's original extension-section was added. In the beginning of the twentieth century, however, the roof of the church began to weaken. There was no hope of getting people's aid due to extremely poor circumstances. Hence, by the Collector of Thane, Revenue Commissioner Northern Division (Ahmedabad) recommended by the Government in the year 1907, church got wooden material from the forest of Shirsat for free. In 1908 Dinda Kurel donated a big church bell to the church. Church bell from the east tower was moved to the west tower one below another. In order to accommodate the growing crowd of devotees, in the interior of the church in 1910, four metallic pillars were raised and a floor on top was built. In 1920 the church was expanded with a section known as the "Alpari" in front of the church.

In 1922 Monsignor Bronz Francesco De Silva cleaned the forest area and worked all the way from the ground and made compound and planted coconut trees. Father Dsilva also trained some young people in the band companies. He started English medium school in 1923 to educate poor people from the area and to make them self-sustained. Initially classrooms were placed near the well. Later classrooms increased to 6 with 2 below the corridor of church bell, 2 below the residence of priests and 2 at the first floor of the church. Bishop Joaquim Lima of Mumbai diocese and subsequent Bishop Thomas Robert had a policy of "Church there school". However, the society here was farming head and was not focusing on education. "We get bread and butter from farming and not by studying". The community of this mentality has turned away from education. As a result, schools of English medium had to be closed. Marathi schools were started in 1935. This school is called "school of padre". Very few students were coming to the school that started at experimental stage. In 1938, Fr. Raymond Mendes, who came as a replacement, used the policy "Church School there" and started the "St. Joseph's School of Marathi" in 1939. In the villages, he used to search for students, comb little girls and bring them to the school on a bicycle. He used to always say "people without education have no choice". Due to his untiring efforts, in 1939 the school became governed. There is a cemetery where there is now a primary school. Fr. Mendes renovated that area with concrete base and made classrooms there up to class 7th.

After 370 years of establishment of the church, on 5 January 1943, the son of the Nandakhal, Rev. Fr. Frank Lobo ordinated by Archbishop Thomas Robert. He was the first local boy to become priest. This is a golden moment in the history of Nandakhal.

=== Late 20th century ===
In 1949, Monsignor Mendes was again appointed as Parish Priest. He put emphasis on education, as well as put efforts on changing old costumes. In the meantime, he started presenting holy mass at Umrale and Nanbhat.

in 1952 Monsignor Sabastian Vaz Parish Priest called the team of "Queen of the Apostles" to work in his parish. In 1935, nuns of "Queens of the Apostles" constructed a convent in front of the church. In 1935, Monsignor Vaz laid the foundation of a future prayer house at Nanabat and Umrale. In the career of Monsignor Vaz, on 7 February 1962 the St. Joseph High School building dedicated to Rev. Mathew Correia was inaugurated. Monsignor Vaz painted the main altar and two sub-altars with golden colors and decorated the top of the altar and on the wall of the altar with colorful paintings including Pentecost painting. Even today these paintings are in the same condition.

On 1 June 1965, Fr. Joseph Misquieta was appointed as the parish priest. During his tenure, the statue of Christ King was raised along the lake. Also on 1 May 1971 the "Saint Vincent de Paul" team was established. Special efforts have been made for independence of the Umrale and Nanbhat. Their efforts were successful and in the year 1970, the Umrale center got the status of an independent parish.

In the year 1973, on the occasion of the church's fourth century year, the main wall was removed between the main church and the "alpari". And a big sliding wooden door was placed at the entrance. The magnificence of the church increased due to the size of this door.

On 1 June 1975, due to the efforts of Monsignor Philip Tavares, the Nanbhat parish became independent. Monsignor Tavares, then took the possession of chawl in front of a church built in 1927, laid it down and constructed a new building there. Since 1975, this new premise was leased to the Bassein Catholic Bank.

On 1 June 1978 Fr. Simon Borges became the principal and parish priest. He renovated church by demolishing sacristy and the home of the priests, and added a magnificent extension to the church and completed the work of the church office and residence. On 27 November 1983, the Cardinal Simon Pimenta performed the blessings ceremony. In his own career, the stage was built up in front of the church.

6 April 1986, the day should be written with golden letters in the history of Nandakhal and never forgotten. Nobel Prize winner Bharat Ratna, Saint Mother Teresa visited the Nandakhal parish.

On 10 May 1988 new center were established at Bolinj When Fr. Edwin Colaco was Paris Priest and Fr. Joe Gonsalves was Principal. The old school building was demolished and the construction of the building was done in that place and on 9 December this was inaugurated.

On 1 January 1990, a new prayer center was started at Jeladi. On 3 November 1991, a new concrete cemetery was built on the west side near the pond.

Monsignor Mendis hall was constructed on top of the primary school building and was inaugurated on 3 May 1996. In a tenure of Fr. Andrew Rodrigues, church celebrated 425th anniversary in the year 1997. This event was organized in presence of Cardinal Oswald Gracious on 31 May 1996. On 22 July 1998, Carmelite convent nuns started new English medium school at Abraham Naka. Carmelite nuns arrived at Nandakhal long back in 1968, but due to the lack of space they continued their work at Lalodi. Later they built a convent at Abraham Naka and relocated.

=== 21st century ===
On 1 May 1999, Rajodi church was inaugurated and on 10 June 2001 Bolinj center was separated as a parish. In a tenure or Fr. Peter Almeida, when Fr. Thomas Lopes was a principal of the school, Monsignor Mendis hall was extended and new monument was built in the name of late Dominica Philip Machado. This was inaugurated on 13 April 2002. Also new "Shijubai Kurel" hall was built up on the top of priest's residence. This was inaugurated on 8 June 2003.

On 1 January 2004, a new prayer chapel was constructed next to the church staircases on the first floor. In the month of June 2005, an English medium school was started to accommodate more students from Nandakhal area.

Jeladi Center was inaugurated on 1 January 2006. On 19 October 2006, a statue of mother Mary of Nazareth was set up.

9 February 2011 was another memorable day in the history of Nandakhal when Pope Benedict's ambassador Cardinal Murphy O'Conner visited Vasai on the occasion of 25th anniversary of Pope John Paul II visit to Vasai. During his visit, Nandakhal parish organized huge event that was attended by thousands of people from rest of the parishes from Vasai. This event was blessed with Cardinal Salvador Pinacio, Cardinal Oswald Gracious and Archbishop Felix Machado. Pope's ambassador was specially honored by then parish priest Father Thomas Lopes. A Statue of Pope John Paul II was handed over to Nandakhal church. At this event, Cardinal Murphy showered special blessings on behalf of Pope Benedict XVI.

On 1 June 2012, Fr. Eric Alphanso was appointed as a parish priest. He is the 57th parish priest of Nandakhal parish. on 8 September 2015, a new church office was constructed next to the chapel.

Holy Spirit (Ghost) church is the "mother of church". Firstly Umrale, then Nanbhat, Bolinj, Virar East, Virar West centers got separated from the parish. Lastly Rajodi center got separated. Now population of Nandakhal is just over seven thousand still the response of devotees in mass and other church related worships is amazing. Holy Spirit's strength and blessings are always being with all of us. Every devotee of the Holy Spirit is indulging in the spirit of self-centeredness and is leading in his field. It has been devoted to the spiritual and religious devotion of the church and to the religious faith. This day Nandakhal parish has sent 68 priests and many nuns to spread the word of god. The devotees here are endowed with auspicious art skills. People here who reached the top of the educational field have reached the far corners of the world. These people are deeply influenced with foresight and the personality of the loyal priests who worked here. And so for the sake of any work and financial help, a call from Father gives a huge response.

On 22 September 2019, Fr Francis D'britto from Jeladi Village of Nandakhal Parish, Virar (West), of the Roman Catholic Diocese of Vasai; was unanimously elected as the president of 93rd Akhil Bharatiya Marathi Sahitya Sammelan (literary meet), which was held in Osmanabad on 10 January 2020.

== Demographics ==
The parish has 2,150 families with a population of 7,339 members as of December 2016.

No	Village	Families*	Population*
1	Father-Wadi	17	57
2	Unganbhat	60	199
3	Vatlai	19	70
4	Padai, Gajure, Morewadi	84	297
5	Angali	46	153
6	Nandan	171	585
7	Ranebhat	96	330
8	Khivani	31	112
9	Torbhat, Vadkhamb	34	104
10	Medodi	48	162
11	Ghotar, Anjeri	72	248
12	khodale	32	79
13	Lalodi	27	100
14	Bavkhal	40	139
15	Banbhat	42	141
16	Medhe, Borbhat	65	218
17	Rumao Ali	117	369
18	Nonodi	26	86
19	Dontalao, Agodi, Sakharbhat	204	704
20	Vatar, Barodi	53	187
21	Adlay	37	150
22	Jeladi	108	401
23	Talai	30	103
24	Ghosali	232	767
25	Kolbhag	150	485
26	Kedar, JP Nagar, Ponda	70	245
27	Ghotkal	57	185
28	Persav	147	552
29	Pedi	35	111
Total		2,150	7,339

*as of Dec 2016

== See also ==
- Kupari - Samvedi Christians
- Roman Catholic Diocese of Vasai
