= Cassa di Risparmio di Roma =

Italian savings bank, 1836 to 1992

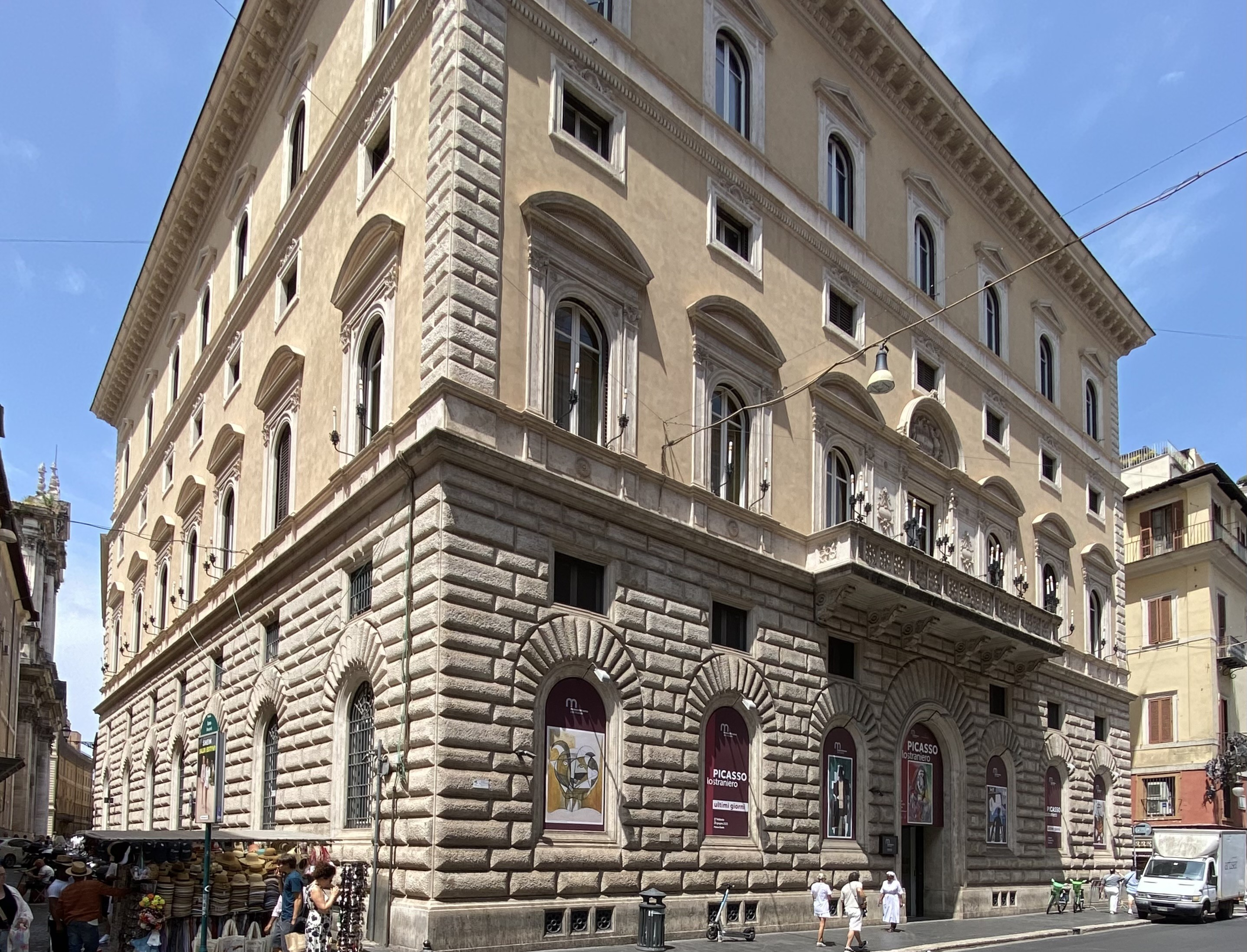
Palazzo della Cassa di Risparmio, Via del Corso in Rome

The Cassa di Risparmio di Roma was an Italian savings bank, founded in 1836 by decree of Pope Gregory XVI. In 1991–92 the bank was reorganized, with its banking operations transferred to a subsidiary società per azioni (S.p.A.), which in turn was absorbed into Banca di Roma. The legal person of the former bank was renamed from Cassa di Risparmio di Roma to Fondazione Cassa di Risparmio di Roma, also known as Fondazione Roma, which also kept the bank's historic head office on Via del Corso 320.

== History ==
The Cassa di Risparmio di Roma was founded in 1836 on the private initiative of members of the Roman aristocracy, of the Papal Curia and of the world of entrepreneurship and high finance. In particular, the promoters of the initiative included Pietro Marini, Count Vincenzo Pianciani, Giampietro Campana, and Carlo Luigi Morichini. 3 May 1836, the Cassa di Risparmio was established with statute of a private company albeit with a charitable intent. On the following 20 June the initiative received authorization from Pope Gregory XVI so that "an establishment so useful to private families and to the whole of civil society be promptly put into operation".

The subscription of the one hundred shares of 50 Roman scudi. On Sunday, 14 August 1836, the Cassa opened its doors to the public in Palazzo Borghese, where Prince Don Francesco Borghese, first president of the Cassa, had allowed it to use several rooms on a cost-free basis. In line with the venture's charitable aims, the directors did not take any personal remuneration.

From the beginning, the Cassa enjoyed widespread success among the Roman population. From the first months of activity there was a notable influx of deposits, considering, among other things, the almost total absence of financial intermediaries in the city and the attractive remuneration (4 percent, with a cap on each customer's total deposit) for a perceived low-risk offering. In the first decade of activity, the Cassa invested in mortgage loans, pontifical public debt securities traded on the Rome Stock Exchange and direct loans to the Apostolic Chamber.

In 1841, the Cassa financed some partners in the acquisition of control of the Banca Romana. Following that transaction, the Cassa entered into an agreement with Banca Romana which allowed it to invest, in a sight current account, its daily liquidity surpluses, which previously remained interest-free.

During the political upheavals associated with the Roman Republic (1849–1850), the Cassa suffered a serious liquidity crisis due to large-scale withdrawals of deposits by its customers (although suspended for a year by a government provision in April 1848) and the crisis of liquidity at Banca Romana as well. In the same years, the Cassa also risked bankruptcy due to the liquidation at a loss of the public debt securities that it held, as well as the decision of the pontifical government not to fully stand for government bonds issued during the republican period. The reserves accumulated by the Cassa in the first decade of activity were barely sufficient to absorb these losses. Although the bank's own funds were almost wiped out by these events (returning to the values of the share capital paid in 1836), the Cassa managed to survive, subsequently strengthening its balance sheet in the last decades of the pontifical government, without however equaling the growth rates experienced in the early years, also due to the entry of competitors onto the Roman financial services market.

In 1937 the bank absorbed the Roman mount of piety (founded in 1539).

By 1977, the Cassa di Risparmio di Roma was the eighteenth Italian bank in terms of total deposits.

In 1982 Cesare Geronzi became general manager of the Cassa di Risparmio di Roma. Under his direction, by the 1980s it expanded beyond the Roman region. In this period, the Banco di Santo Spirito, which was controlled by the government's Istituto per la Ricostruzione Industriale, found itself in economic difficulties. The Cassa di Risparmio intended to buy it, but did not have the cash resources to buy it outright. Instead, it sold its branches to the Banco di Santo Spirito in exchange of shares, thus becoming a holding company. Geronzi then masterminded the successive mergers that led to the creation of Banca di Roma in 1992, then Capitalia in 2002.

== See also ==
- Banca di Roma
- List of banks in Italy
