= Banco di Santo Spirito =

Historical Italian banking institute

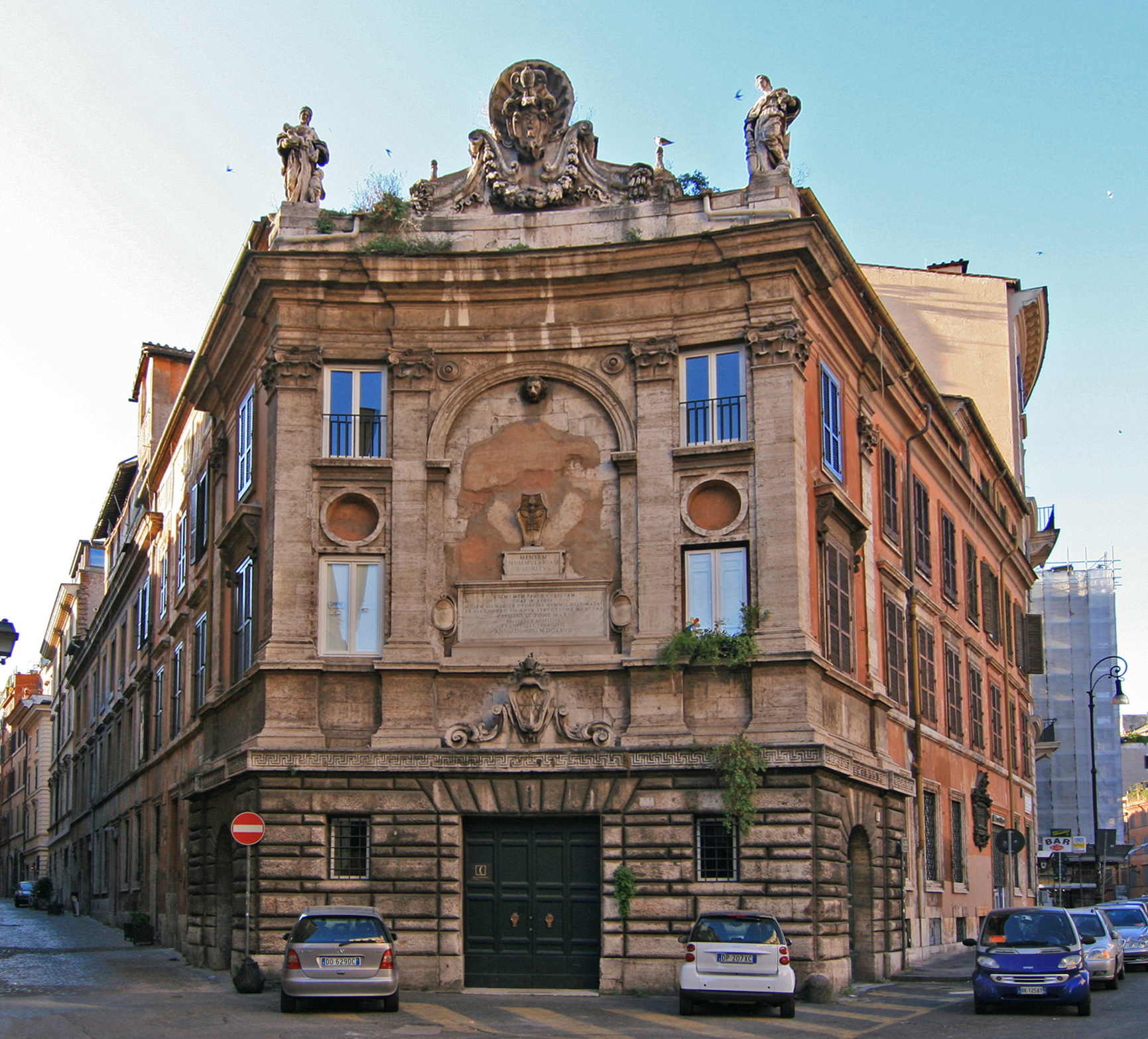

The Bank of the Holy Spirit (Italian: Il Banco di Santo Spirito) was a bank founded by Pope Paul V on 13 December 1605. The bank was the first central bank in Europe (as the bank of the Papal States) at a level above city-states, the first public deposit bank in Rome, and the oldest continuously operating bank in Rome until its merger in 1992.

== First period (1605–1923) ==
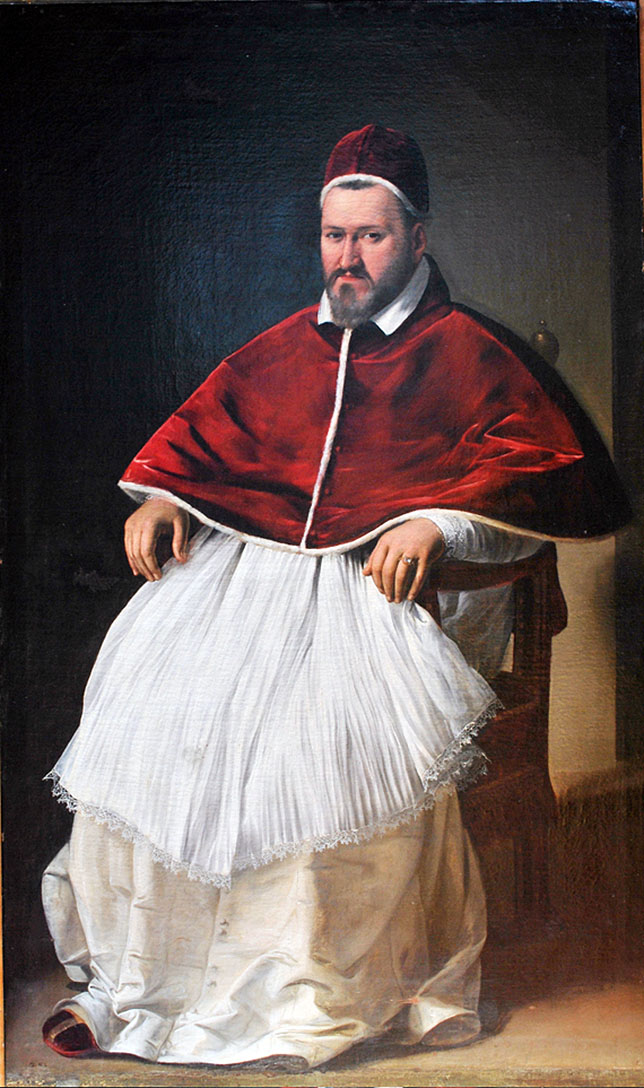
Pope Paul V founded the Bank in 1605.

The Bank was founded by Pope Paul V in the Bench of S. Spirit building (which became known as the Palazzo del Banco di S. Spirito) on 13 December 1605. The construction of the building was started in 1513 by Pope Leo X, on what became known as the "Street of the Banks." The newly founded bank provided a new source of income for the Archhospital of Santo Spirito (founded 1201), whose financial difficulties had been increasing throughout the 16th century, and in 1607 the bank began supervising the finances of the hospital, which owned the bank.

From 20 February 1606 to 1923 the Bank of the Holy Spirit provided capital for churches and hospitals constructed in Rome, and other commercial purposes. The bank lent funds to several public works projects, including the Trajan aqueduct project (Begun 1608).

In 1750, Pope Benedict XIV, known for his condemnation of usury: Vix pervenit (promulgated 1 November 1745), reorganized the Bank and restricted its lending activities. In 1786, the bank became one of the first to issue paper money during the pontificate of Pope Pius VI. By the late 19th century, the bank was controlled by the state.

The records of the Bank are extant in the Vatican Secret Archives, but not in Introitus et Exitus, the records of the Apostolic Camera.

== Second period (1923–1989) ==
In 1923, the Bank was reorganized as a joint-stock company. In 1935, the Istituto per la Ricostruzione Industriale (IRI) of the fascist Italian government gained a controlling interest in the bank.

In the 1930s, Neapolitan bank robbers attempting to dig into the underground vaults of the Bank accidentally discovered the skeletons of victims of an 1836 cholera epidemic, which after archeological excavation became known as the Fontanelle cemetery.

== Disappearance by merger (1989-1991) ==
In 1989–1991, the Banco di Santo Spirito merged with Cassa di Risparmio di Roma (est. 1836). In 1992, the resulting entity in turn merged with Banco di Roma (est. 1880) to form Banca di Roma, which itself merged with other banks in 2002 to form Capitalia.

== See also ==
- Vatican Bank
- Banco Ambrosiano
- List of banks in Italy
