= Canton of Sorgues =

Coordinates: 44.01°N 4.88°E

- Canton
- Situation of the canton of Sorgues in the department of Vaucluse
- Country: France
- Region: Provence-Alpes-Côte d'Azur
- Department: Vaucluse
- No. of communes: {{{nbcomm}}}
- Population (2023): 38,354
- INSEE code: 8415

The canton of Sorgues is an administrative division of the Vaucluse department, in southeastern France. It was created at the French canton reorganisation which came into effect in March 2015. Its seat is in Sorgues.

It consists of the following communes:

1. Bédarrides
2. Châteauneuf-du-Pape
3. Courthézon
4. Jonquières
5. Sorgues
