= Château de l'Hers =

Coordinates: 44.0542°N 4.7915°E

The origins of the Château de l'Hers, in Châteauneuf-du-Pape on the banks of the Rhône, go back to the beginning of the 10th century. Until the French Revolution it was an enclave of Languedoc in the Comtat Venaissin. Protected as a historic monument since 1973, it has given its name to a winery.

== History ==
=== Early history ===
Various elements of the château de l'Hers attest to the occupation of this strategically important location as a control point for river traffic, since late Antiquity at the latest. Several tombs with saddleback roofs form a small 6th-7th necropolis not far from the first known chapel of the château, dedicated to Saints Cosmas and Damian. An excavation of this ruined church found lithic industries, and sherds from antiquity and the Iron Age, fragments of Tegula tiles and a cipolin cladding probably dating to Antiquity were re-used in the masonry. A large number of weapons, coins and medals were found in the area. The tollgate on the Rhône was put in place in 79 AD under Vespasian, according to V. Millet (1864).

There must have been a Roman castrum, probably destroyed in the great invasions. This appeared under the name of castellum de Leri in a 913 charter. It was signed by Louis the Blind and ceded it to Foulques, Bishop of Avignon.

=== Châteauneuf-du-Pape ===
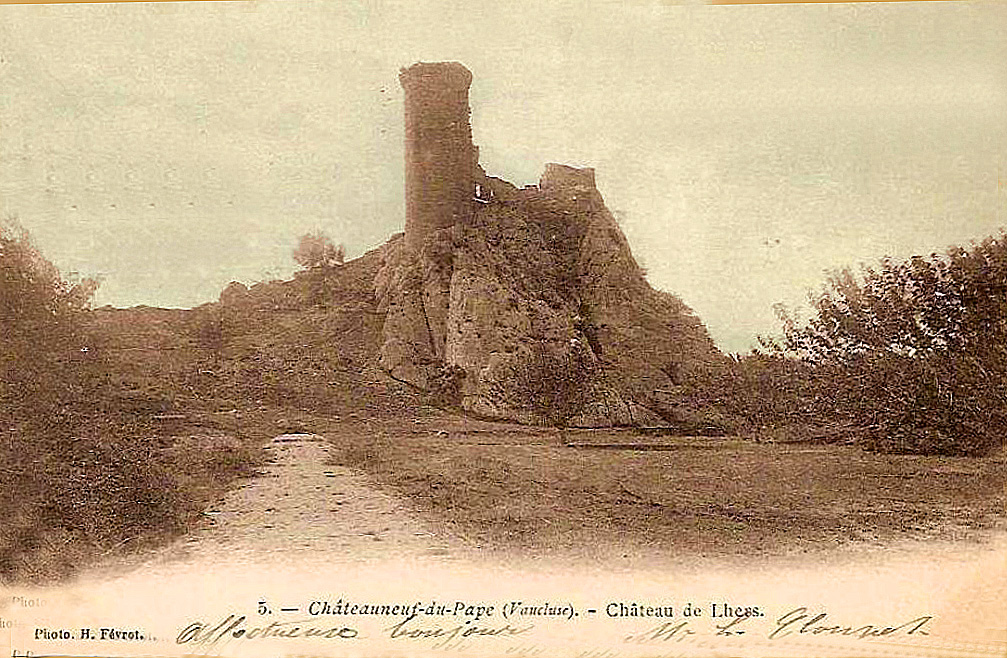
The old château of Châteauneuf-du-Pape

In 1077, his successor Rostaing granted the fief to Pierre d'Albaron, who built a keep there. The first mention of a Castro Novo (new fortified village), which led to the name Châteauneuf-du-Pape, does not appear until 1094 It became the château de l'Hers after it was expanded in the 12th century and then was renovated for the first time during the 13th century. Certain historians have said that the Knights Templar used it at the end of the 12th century. This legend was disproven by the historians in the 20th century.

L'Hers (or Lair, or Lers), become an enclave of Languedoc on the right bank of the Rhône, the château and its village were in ruins during the 12th century. Historical texts say that the parish had two places of worship, the parish church named Sainte-Marie and the château's chapel dedicated to Saints Cosmas and Damian

Jacques d'Euze, formerly bishop of Avignon, was elected pope in 1316 and took the name John XXII. Châteauneuf fell directly under his authority. Barely pope for three months, he had construction undertaken at l'Hers. The accounts of the Apostolic Camera say that he allocated 3,000 florins to the restoration of the old 12-century château.

=== Rhône tollgate and watch tower ===
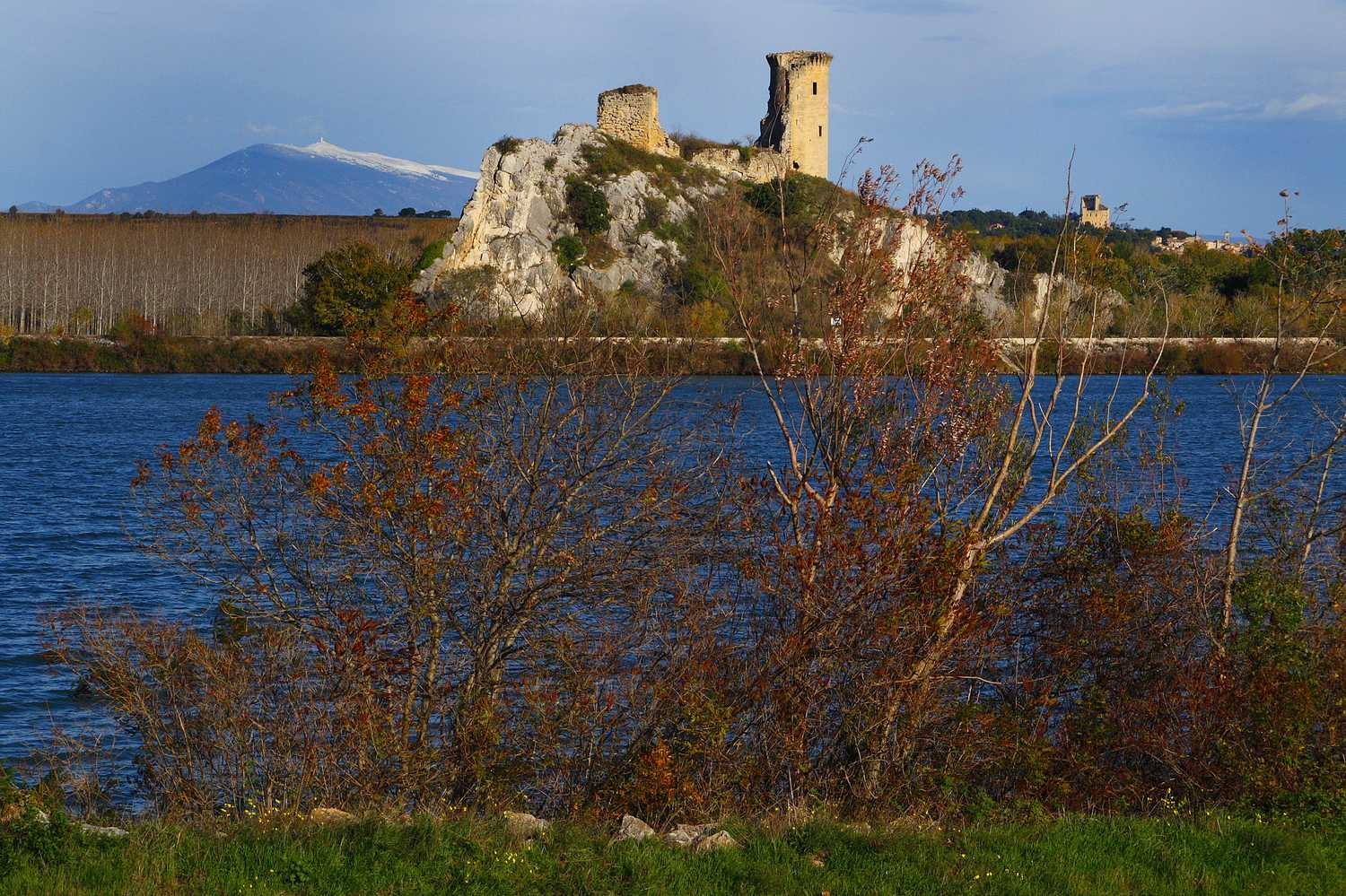
Le château seen from Roquemaure

During the Middle Ages, the old château was a watch post and toll station on the Rhône which passed to different families allied to the Albaron family.

The Albaron kept their fief until 1360, when it was transferred to the de Roquefeuil family as a dowry. Around 1400, it came back to the Albaron de Laudin des Baux family, who kept it until the 1420s. The last heiress of this family brought it as a dowry to an Allemand. That family then took the name Allemand de Laudun Albaron. During the 16th century its toll rights fell in turn to the Arpajon Cardaillac, Monteynard and Montmorency families, then to the Duke of Lévis Ventadour. Hercule de Rohan, prince of Soubise, inherited it and his family still owned it when the French Revolution broke out.

The tolls were abolished with the abrogation of aristocratic privileges during the French Revolution, and the enclave of l'Hers was attached to the new department of Vaucluse.

=== Winery ===
Today the château is private property. At the winery that takes its name, Marcel Georges elaborates a red Châteauneuf-du-pape with a base of Syrah, Mourvèdre, Muscardin, Counoise, Cinsault, Grenache, Vaccarese and Terret, and a white Châteauneuf-du-pape which blends Picardan, Roussanne, Clairette, Picpoul and white Grenache. With an area of 14 hectares, it's one of the rare wineries allowed to use the name, which is an appellation d'origine controllée, to offer the full array of the thirteen Châteauneuf-du-Pape varieties.

Thirteen grape varieties of Châteauneuf-du-Pape
Name and origin			Description
Grenache	Spain	Grenache	A vigorous plant, this variety dominates the winery with 60% of the cultivated surface. In the Vaucluse, the northern limit of its range, it reveals its full potential by producing a wine that has a light color and great aromatic strength, with notes of kirsch, prunes and cassis
Mourvèdre	Spain	Mourvèdre	A late-maturing variety sensitive to dry conditions, it brings specific aromas to the wine as it ages. Its qualitative nature also give wine a profound color and tannins apt to refine over the years.
Syrah	Rhône Valley	Syrah	Well-represented in Châteauneuf-du-pape, this variety, beyond its great aromatic richness, gives colour and melded tannins. When blended with grenache and mourvèdre, it produces wines that truffle note
Cinsaut	Provence	Cinsaut	Dual-use grape - both a wine and a table grape - it is cultivated somewhat lesshere because it doesn't have much tannin or color. It brings elegance, fruitiness and finesse to the wine.
Muscardin	Vaucluse	Muscardin	Originally from the departement of Vaucluse, when made into wine it is always blended with other varieties. It brings floral notes and freshness to the wine.
Counoise	Spain or Vaucluse	Counoise	Originally from Spain, it was offered to Pope Urbain V then pope at Avignon — by a vice-légat named Counesa. In wines it is always blended and brings finesse, suppleness et fruitiness. These wines have a deep and brilliant color and aromas of spices, prune and blackberry.
Clairette	Provence and Languedoc	Clairette	A native variety and thus particuliarly well-adapted to a location that combines heat and pebbly soil, it produces buttery wines with complex aromas which mix citrus and white flowers
Bourboulenc	Provence and Languedoc	Bourboulenc	A late variety, which thrives in hot, dry, low-altitude locations, it is therefore particularly well-adapted to Châteauneuf-du-Pape. It brings balance and produces a lively, very floral wine, full of subtle although fleeting aromas of bitter almond, vanilla and green apple.
Roussanne	Valley of the Rhône	Roussanne	A very qualitative wine, it brings Châteauneuf wines elegance and finesse. Its aromas are characterised by floral notes mixing scents of iris, violets and honeysuckle.
Piquepoul	Rhône valley and Languedoc	Piquepoul	Originally from Languedoc, its wine, aromatic with a strong bouquet, is rich, full of finesse, elegance and typicity
Picardan	Provence	Picardan	Originally from Provence, this variety is vigorous and productive. When made into wine it brings typicity, bouquet and finesse.
Terret noir	Valley of the Rhône and Languedoc	Terret noir	Often combined with grenache and syrah, whose power it attenuates, this makes a light wine with a pale color, light, but with an agreeable bouquet carried by a good acidity.
Vaccarèse	Camargue	Vaccarèse	Originally from lower Provence, it makes a light floral wine with little color, fresh and elegant. In blends, it moderates the ardor of grenache.

Although the winery kept the name of the château it does not include the name in its business since the château lies outside the Appellation d'origine contrôlée terroir. Only the lower chamber of the medieval keep and the 14th-century round tower remain of the château, along with a few vestiges of the ramparts. The site was registered as a monument historique in 1973.
