= Introitus et Exitus =

Financial record of the Vatican secret archives

Introitus et Exitus Cameræ Apostolicæ (Latin: What Comes In and What Goes Out of the Apostolic Camera) is a six-hundred-and-six-volume financial record of the Apostolic Camera of the Holy See, from 1279 to 1524, located in the Vatican Secret Archives. The volumes span the reigns of thirty-two popes from Pope Nicholas III to Pope Clement VII. The volumes relating to the Avignon Popes (1305—1387) as well as the following antipopes were moved from Comtat Venaissin to the Secret Archives in 1783.

The records include both the books in which an array of Curial officials recorded receipts and expenditures, and general annual accounts of items. They were recorded in journal form until 1378, denoting the expenditures of each subset of the papal household, military expenses, construction costs, and art commissioning. However, Introitus et Exitus is fundamentally an incomplete record of the financial dealings of the Holy See, as the Apostolic Camera itself represents only the surplusses of various regional transactions, and popes conducted significant financial dealings off balance sheet. Notably, these records often exclude direct cash payments made by popes themselves or mediated through the Curia's Bank of the Holy Spirit.

Because of the thoroughness of the records down to the minutest details, they have been used by historians to establish the daily living conditions in the papal household and the administration of the Papal States. The records have been utilized by art historians, notably Eugène Müntz, to determine the number of artists who contributed to certain works, authenticate works of unknown origin, and to discover previously unknown works. They have also been scoured by economic historians to study past European exchange rates and interest rates. The sudden appearance of debts from the Apostolic Camera to Cardinals Campofregoso, Domenico della Rovere, Sanseverino, and Orsini after a gap in the records in August 1492 has been used to allege that simony occurred in the papal conclave, 1492.

Other records of the Apostolic Camera include Liber Censuum (492—1192), Obligationes et Solutiones, Obligationes communes, Collectoriae, and Diversae Cameralia; the artificially created Registra Vaticana includes documents of the Camera mixed with those of the Chancery of Apostolic Briefs, and other secretariats; the Registra Avenionensia catalogs materials relating jointly to the Chancery and the Camera.
