= Courthézon =

- Commune
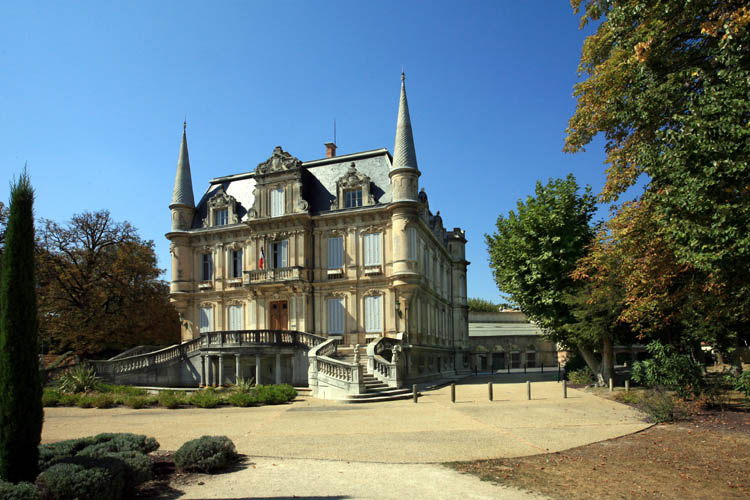
- Château de Val-Seille housing the town hall of Courthézon

- Coat of arms
- Location of Courthézon
- Location within France Location within Provence-Alpes-Côte d'Azur
- Coordinates: 44°05′18″N 4°53′05″E
- Country: France
- Region: Provence-Alpes-Côte d'Azur
- Department: Vaucluse
- Arrondissement: Carpentras
- Canton: Sorgues
- Intercommunality: CC Pays d'Orange en Provence

Government
  - Mayor (2020–2026): Nicolas Paget
- Area^{1}: 32.78 km^{2} (12.66 sq mi)
- Elevation: 31 m (102 ft)
- Highest elevation: 126 m (413 ft)
- Lowest elevation: 27 m (89 ft)
- Population (2023): 6,426
  - Density: 196.0/km^{2} (507.7/sq mi)
- Time zone: UTC+01:00 (CET)
  - Summer (DST): UTC+02:00 (CEST)
- INSEE/Postal code: 84039 /84350
- ^{1} French Land Register data, which excludes lakes, ponds, glaciers > 1 km^{2} (0.386 sq mi or 247 acres) and river estuaries.

Courthézon (French pronunciation: [kuʁtezɔ̃]; Occitan: Corteson) is a commune in the Vaucluse department in the Provence-Alpes-Côte d'Azur region in southeastern France.

== Population ==
Historical population
Year	Pop.	±% p.a.
1968	3,947	—
1975	4,337	+1.36%
1982	4,498	+0.52%
1990	5,166	+1.75%
1999	5,364	+0.42%
2007	5,309	−0.13%
2012	5,453	+0.54%
2017	5,639	+0.67%
2023	6,426	+2.20%
Source: INSEE

== See also ==
- Communes of the Vaucluse department
