= Sorgues =

Sorgues Sòrgas (Occitan)
- Commune
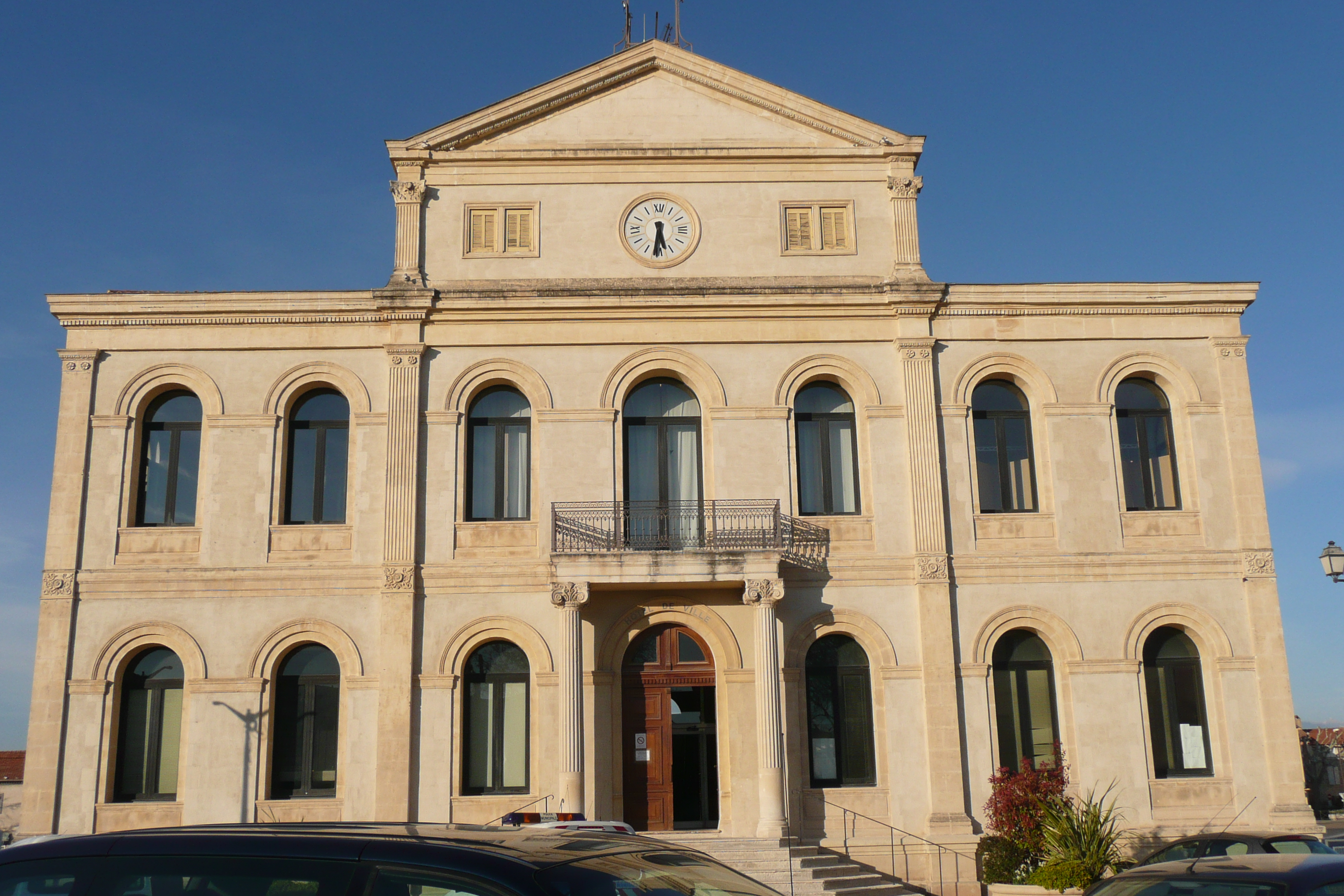
- Former Sorgues Town Hall

- Coat of arms
- Location of Sorgues
- Location within France Location within Provence-Alpes-Côte d'Azur
- Coordinates: 44°00′33″N 4°52′23″E
- Country: France
- Region: Provence-Alpes-Côte d'Azur
- Department: Vaucluse
- Arrondissement: Avignon
- Canton: Sorgues
- Intercommunality: CA Sorgues du Comtat

Government
  - Mayor (2020–2026): Thierry Lagneau
- Area^{1}: 33.4 km^{2} (12.9 sq mi)
- Elevation: 30 m (98 ft)
- Highest elevation: 114 m (374 ft)
- Lowest elevation: 14 m (46 ft)
- Population (2023): 19,006
  - Density: 569/km^{2} (1,470/sq mi)
- Time zone: UTC+01:00 (CET)
  - Summer (DST): UTC+02:00 (CEST)
- INSEE/Postal code: 84129 /84700
- ^{1} French Land Register data, which excludes lakes, ponds, glaciers > 1 km^{2} (0.386 sq mi or 247 acres) and river estuaries.

Sorgues (French pronunciation: [sɔʁɡ]; Occitan: Sòrgas) is a commune in the southeastern French department of Vaucluse. The river Ouvèze, a tributary of the Rhône, as well as its tributary Sorgue, which begins at the Fontaine de Vaucluse, run through the commune. Sorgues is located just north of Avignon, on the border with Gard.

== History ==
According to The Autobiography of Alice B. Toklas by Gertrude Stein, Georges Braque lived in Sorgues after being wounded during the First World War.

== Population ==
Historical population
Year	Pop.	±% p.a.
1968	13,624	—
1975	15,037	+1.42%
1982	17,112	+1.86%
1990	17,236	+0.09%
1999	17,539	+0.19%
2007	18,521	+0.68%
2012	18,473	−0.05%
2017	18,680	+0.22%
2023	19,006	+0.29%
Source: INSEE

== See also ==
- Communes of the Vaucluse department
- Châteauneuf-du-Pape AOC
