= Barbariga, Croatia =

Hamlet in Croatia

Barbariga
- Village
- Location within Croatia
- Country: Croatia
- County: Istria County
- Municipality: Vodnjan

Population (2021)
  - Total: 0
- Time zone: UTC+1 (CET)
  - Summer (DST): UTC+2 (CEST)

Barbariga is a hamlet, administratively part of village of Peroj in the Town of Vodnjan, Istria, west Croatia. It is located near the Barbariga peninsula or Punta Cissana (named after the lost ancient settlement of Cissa), 22 km northwest of Pula, northwest of Fažana and Vodnjan and southwest of Bale.

Apart from the actual village of Barbariga (which comprises a small shopping/restaurant centre and a modest housing estate) the area is virtually unpopulated. It boasts a coastline backed by (relatively) flat land, which is unusual in this part of Croatia, where the mountains generally crash straight into the sea. As of 2006, there was a major plan afoot to build Croatia's first integrated resort by 2013. This will comprise a luxury hotel that will include a spa, wellness center and meeting facilities; a variety of residential offerings totaling more than 460 units; a 350-berth marina; and an 18-hole golf course designed by Jack Nicklaus.

== Sources ==
- Barbariga (in Croatian)
- Barbariga at Istrapedia.hr (in Croatian)
