= Gajana, Croatia =

Gajana Gaiano
- Village
- Location within Croatia
- Coordinates: 45°00′25″N 13°49′55″E
- Country: Croatia
- County: Istria County
- Municipality: Vodnjan

Area
  - Total: 6.1 sq mi (15.8 km^{2})

Population (2021)
  - Total: 185
  - Density: 30.3/sq mi (11.7/km^{2})
- Time zone: UTC+1 (CET)
  - Summer (DST): UTC+2 (CEST)
- Postal code: 52215 Vodnjan
- Area code: 052

Gajana (Italian: Gaiano) is a village in the municipality of Vodnjan-Dignano, in Istria, Croatia.

== Demographics ==
According to the 2021 census, its population was 185. It was 172 in 2011.
