= Peroj =

Peroj Перој
- Village
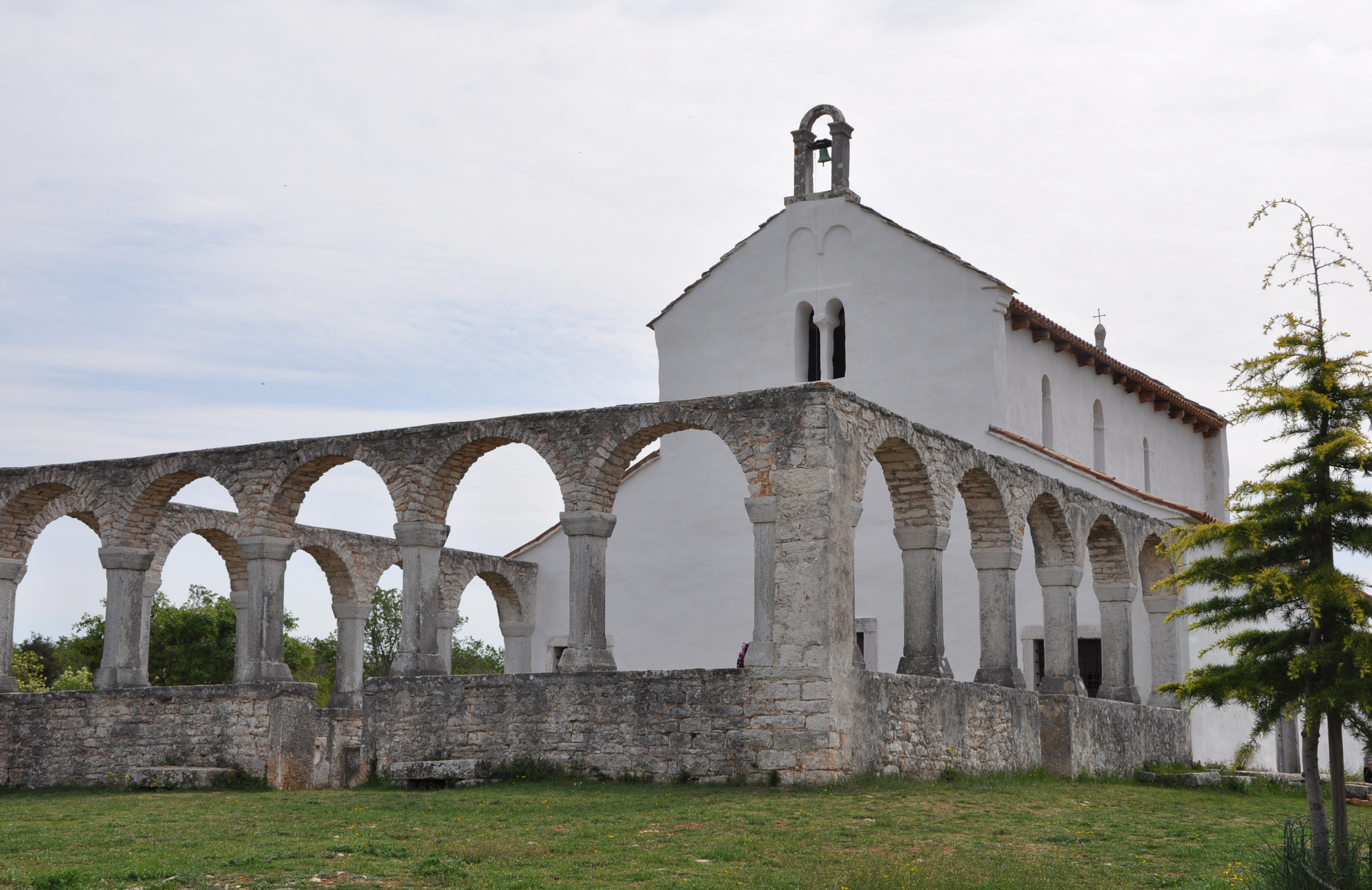
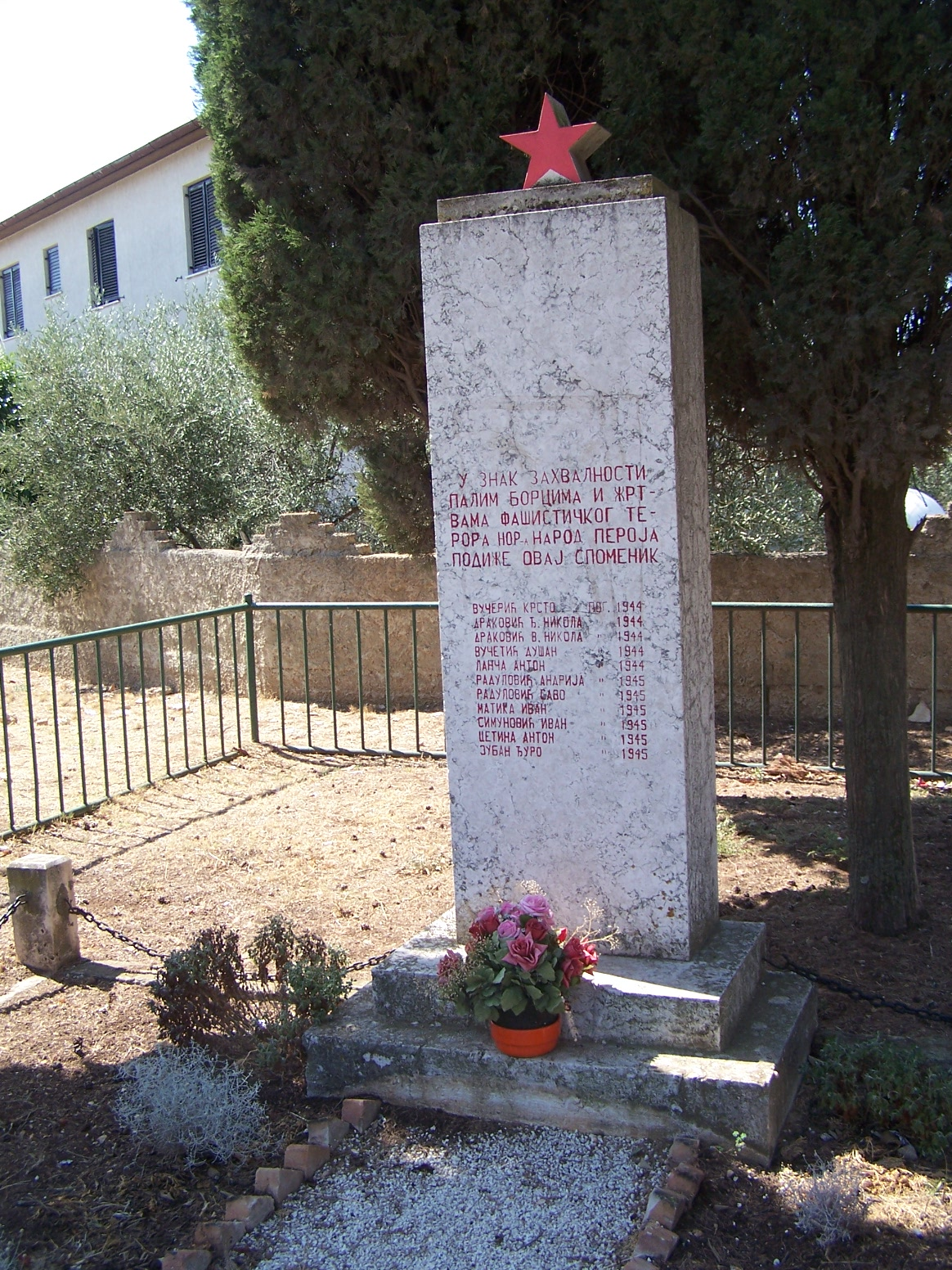
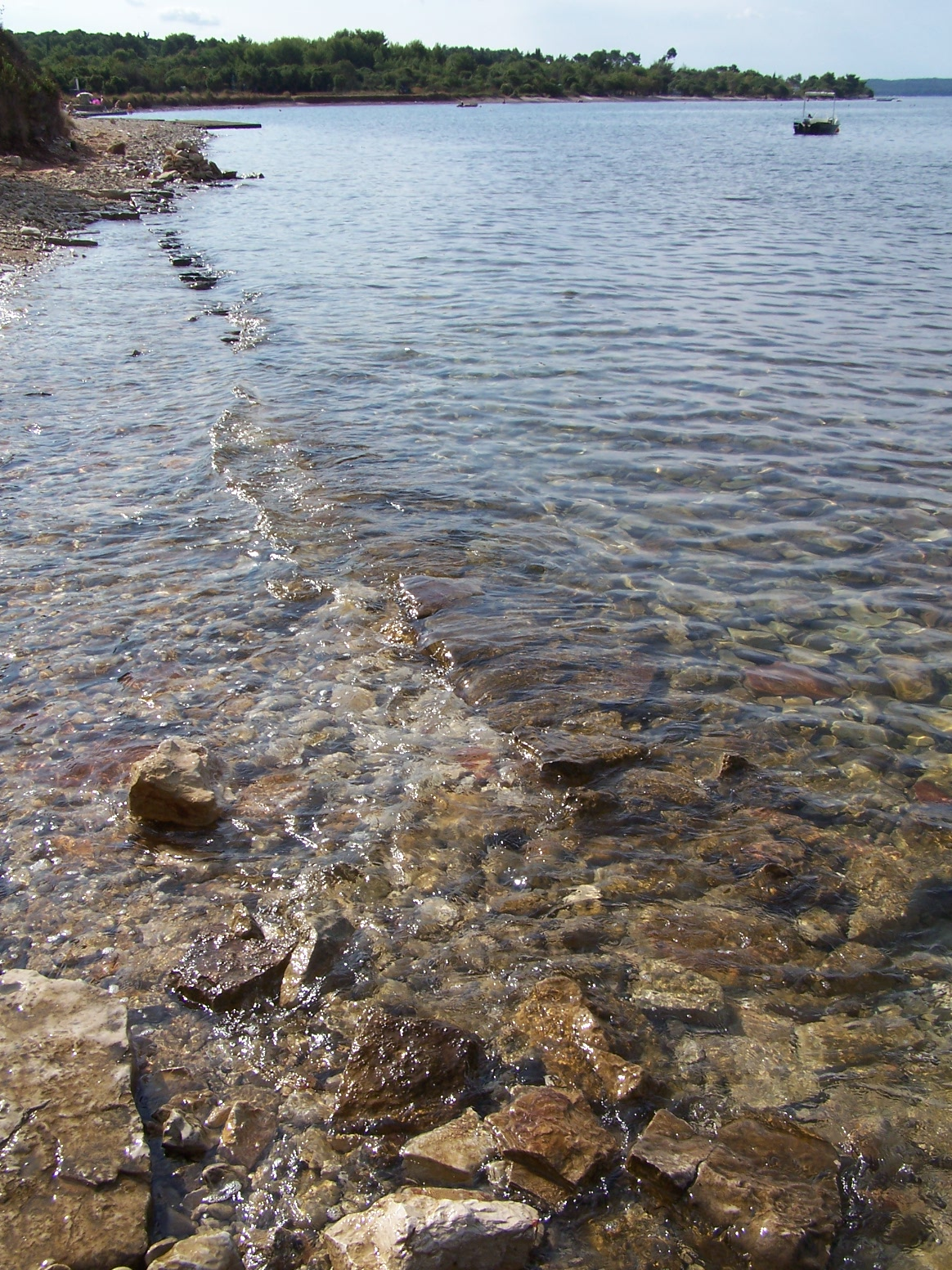
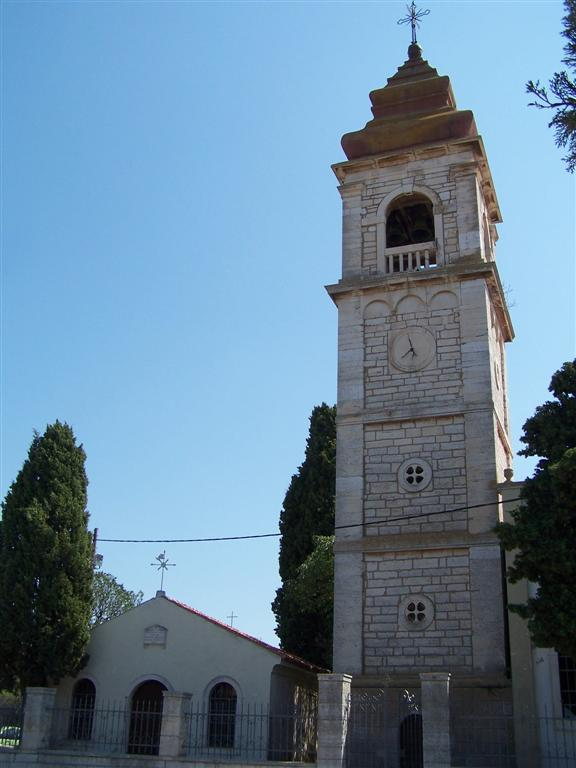
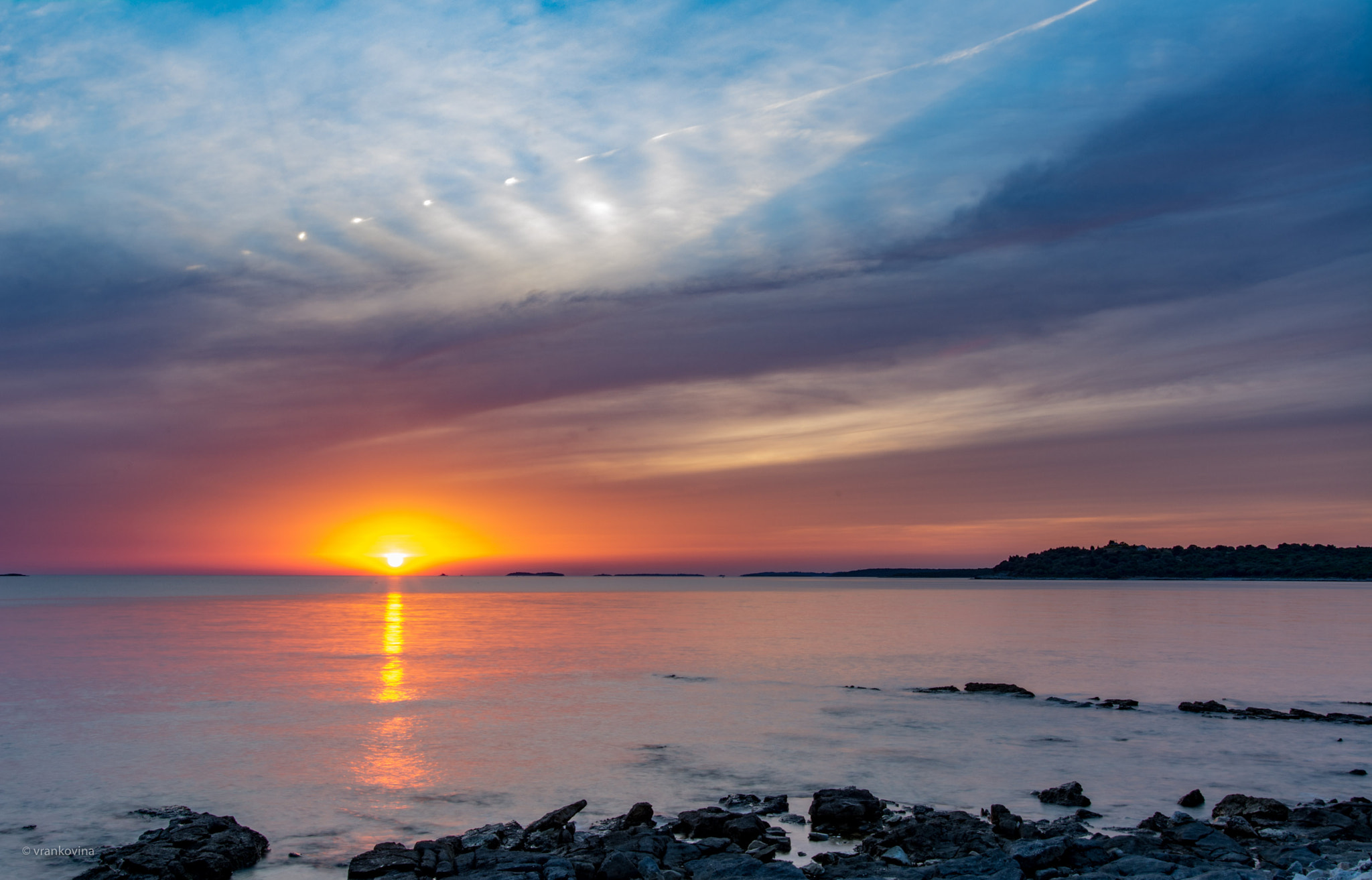
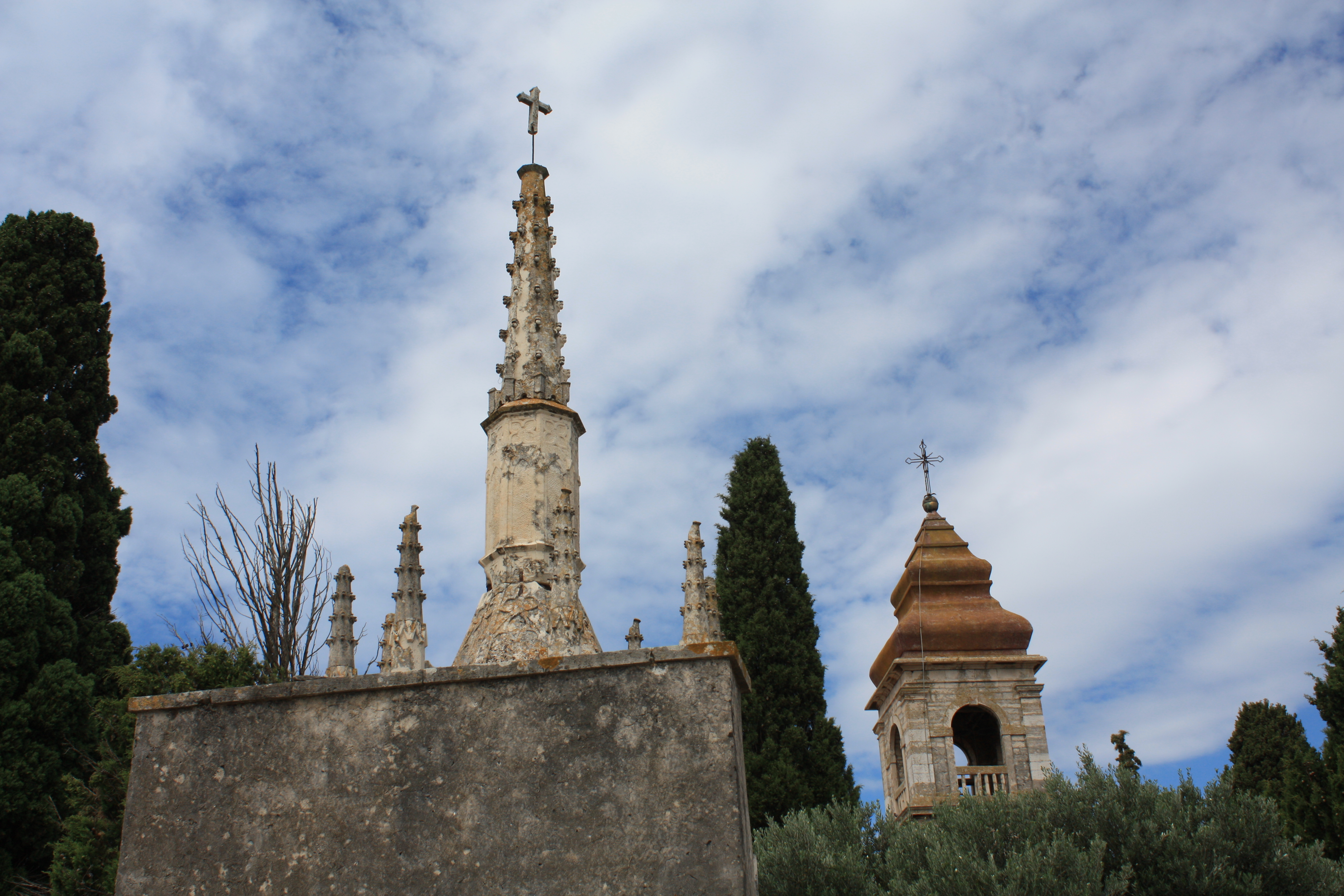

- Location within Croatia
- Coordinates: 44°57′7″N 13°47′49″E
- Country: Croatia
- County: Istria County
- Municipality: Vodnjan

Area
  - Total: 6.6 sq mi (17.2 km^{2})

Population (2021)
  - Total: 900
  - Density: 140/sq mi (52/km^{2})
- Time zone: UTC+1 (CET)
  - Summer (DST): UTC+2 (CEST)
- Postal code: 52212
- Area code: +385 52
- Car plates: PU

Peroj (Montenegrin Cyrillic: Перој) is a village in the Town of Vodnjan on the southwestern coast of Istria, Croatia. Peroj originally dates back to the Copper Age of prehistory, as testified by a necropolis within the old walls of the village. The village has been settled by families from a variety of origins throughout its history. During the occupation of the Romans, the town was named Pedrolo, and was a popular holiday destination.

== Etymology ==
The term "Peroj" is of debatable origin. One theory suggested by Bernardo Schiavuzzi claims that near modern-day Peroj a settlement known as Petroriolum (Petroro) existed ca. 1197. Camillo de Franceschi, however, suggested that Peroj derives from the archaic name "Pedroli". An alternate theory suggests that the Montenegrin settlers derived the term Peroj from the Albanian word for stream - përrua (definite "përroi").

== History ==
In 1562 the town had been emptied due to malaria and the plague, and Leonardo Fioravanti from Bologna brought 124 families of farmers to the area from the Romagna region of present day Italy, some of which settled in Peroj. However the people from Pula felt their territories had been violated and began a series of persecutions which lead the families to leave the area.

In 1578 some Greek families were brought to the area, and between 1580 and 1583, 25 more Greek families from Nauplio had settled in Peroj, and 25 families from Cyprus had also settled. In 1585 the families from Nauplio renounced the lands given to them and left the area. The Cypriots remained, but gradually some left and some died due to the plagues affecting the region, and in 1644 the population of Peroj was reduced to three people only.

In 1657, the Doge of Venice, Bertuccio Valiero, decided to repopulate the town by bringing 15 families. Five of these families were of Orthodox Christians, originally from the Cernizza region in Montenegro that had escaped from the Turkish occupation. Based on evidence, it is generally assumed that these Montenegrin settlers carried the surnames Brcela, Draković, Brajić, Vučeta, and Ljubotina. The remaining ten were Roman Catholics, but of unknown origin and are thought to be either of Croatian origin from Albania Veneta or of Albanian origin. However, these Catholic families soon emigrated from Peroj. Following the Cretan War of 1645–1669, twenty other families originally from Montenegro migrated to Peroj, amounting to 25 in total by 1677. These families remained in Peroj and until recently Serbo-Croatian was taught in the local schools due to their presence.

== Demographics ==
According to the 2021 census, its population was 900. It was 832 in 2011.

Year	Population
1818	243
1852	288
1857	178
1869	219
1880	222
1890	267
1900	287
1910	305
1921	328
1931	392
1948	475
1953	484
1961	498
1971	409
1981	403
1991	477
2001	752
2011	832
2021	900

== Religion ==
The majority of the population is of the Serbian Orthodox faith with a Roman Catholic minority.

Three Christian churches exist in Peroj:

- Church of St. Stephen - Catholic church
- Church of St. Fusca - Catholic church
- Church of St. Spyridon - Serbian Orthodox church

Due to the overwhelming presence of Eastern Orthodox followers, the Orthodox church of Saint Spyridon (San Spiridione) was built in the 19th century following the conversion of the former Catholic church of Saint Jerome.

== Photo gallery ==
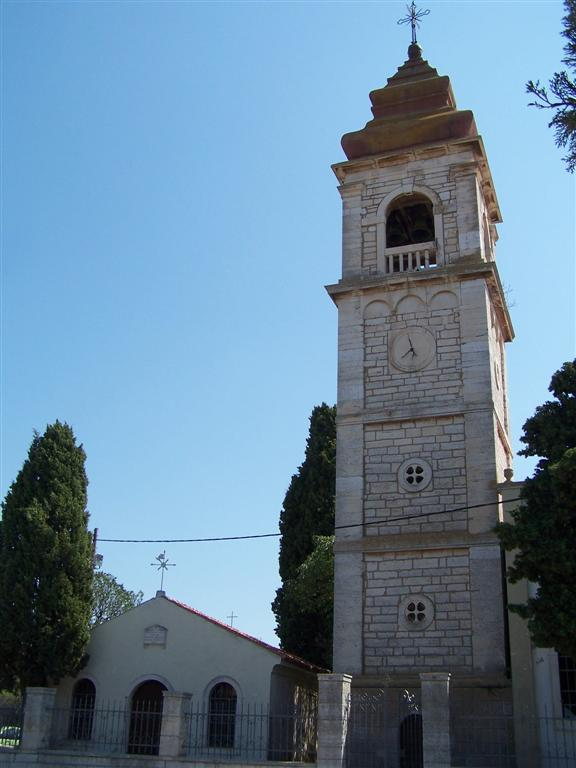
St. Spyridon Church

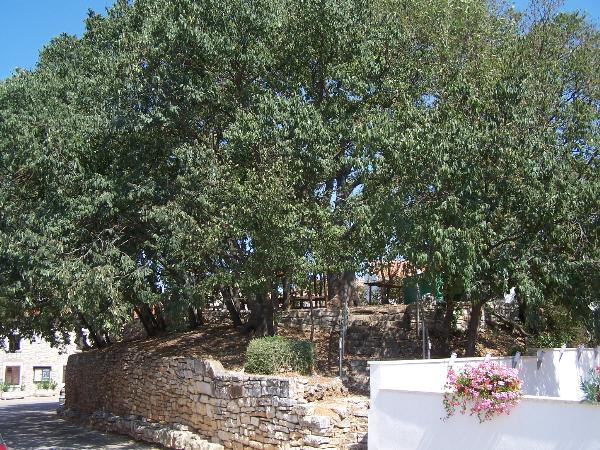
Peroj Town Square

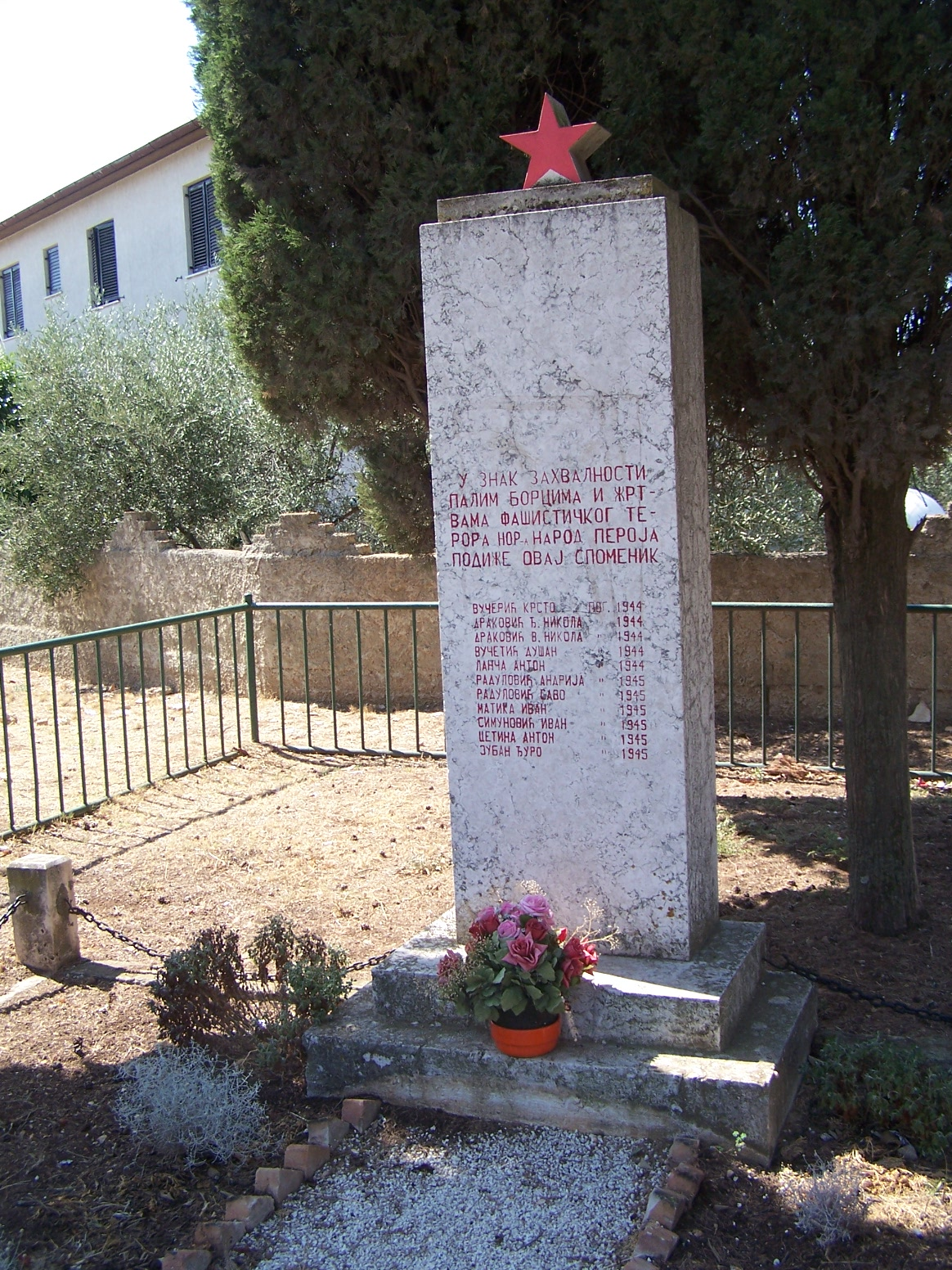
Peroj Memorial

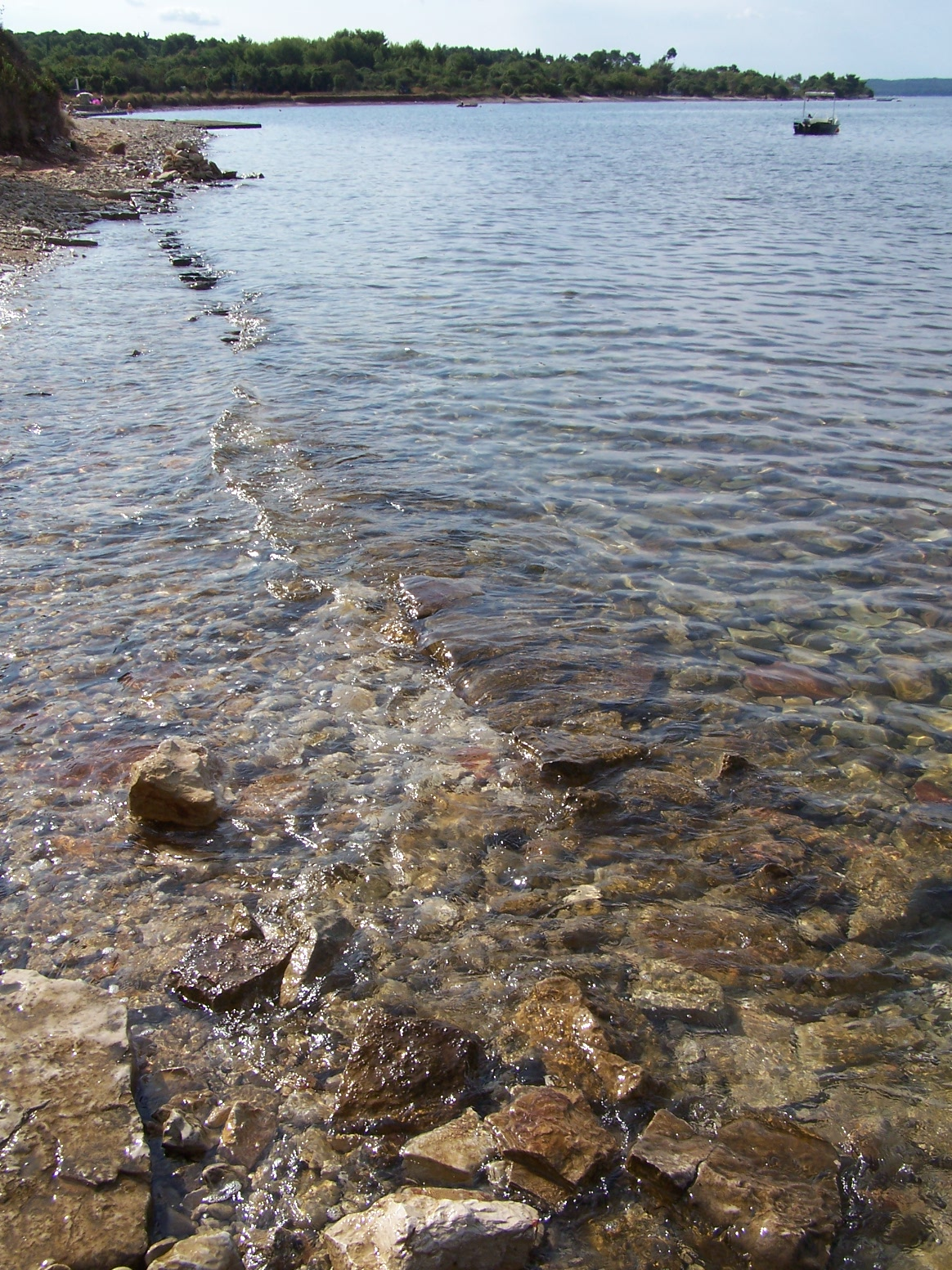
Roman artefacts along the beach

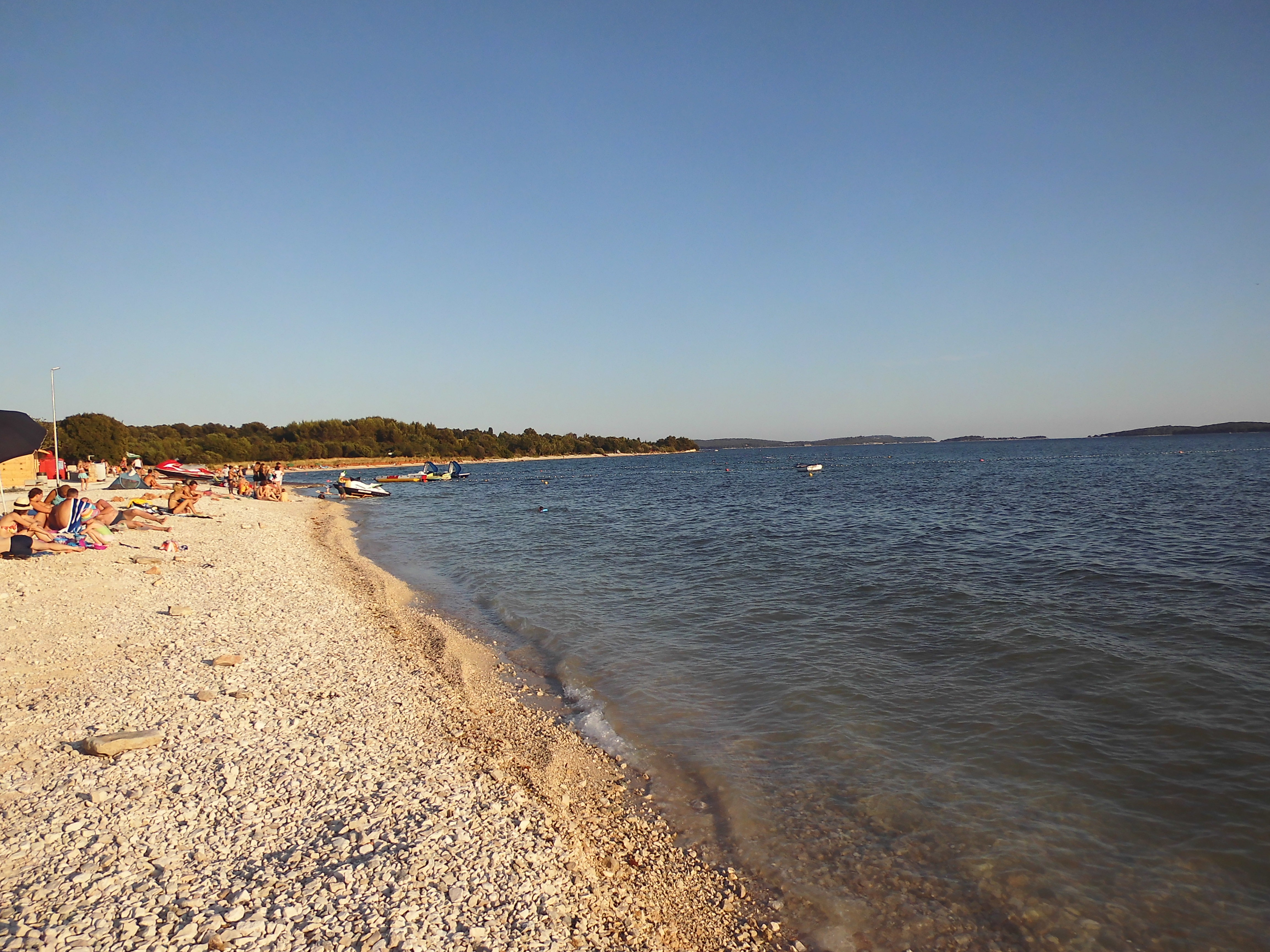
The beach in Peroj

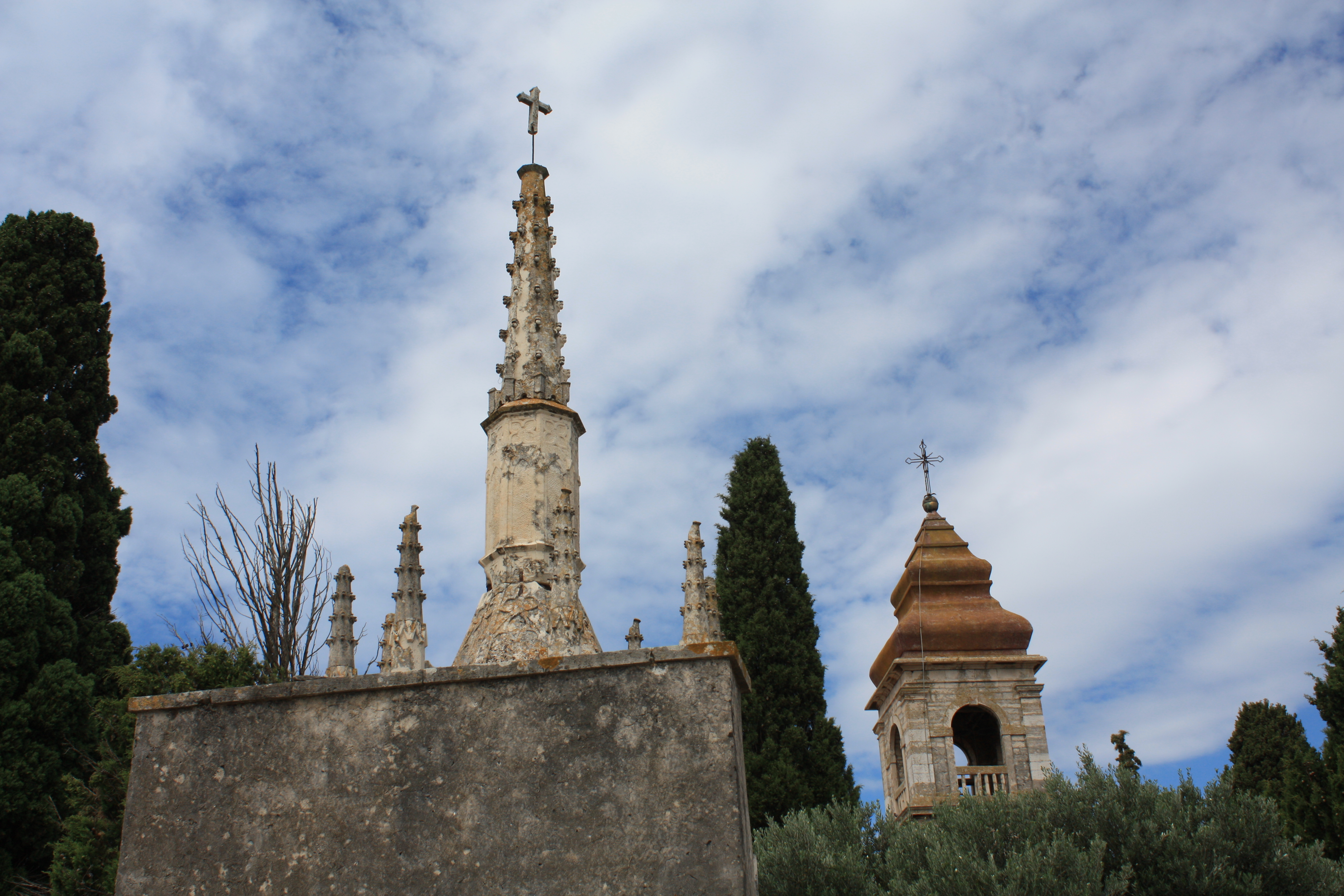
Church tower

== See also ==
- Barbariga, Croatia
- St. Spyridon Church, Peroj

== Sources ==
- Fran Barbalić (1933). "Peroj - srpsko selo u Istri" (in Serbo-Croatian). Rastko.
- Mirko Barjaktarović. Љубомир Рељић (ed.). "IDENTIFICATION OF RELIGIOUS WITH NATIONAL AFFILIATION (Example of Peroj in Istria)". Гласник Етнографског музеја у Београду књ. 54-55. Etnografski muzej u Beogradu: 257–265. GGKEY:GJ75E77KY3K.
