= St. Spyridon Church, Peroj =

Serbian Orthodox churxh in Peroj, Croatia

Coordinates: 44.950943°N 13.798753°E

Saint Spyridon Church, Peroj
- Hram svetoga Spiridona; Храм светог Спиридона
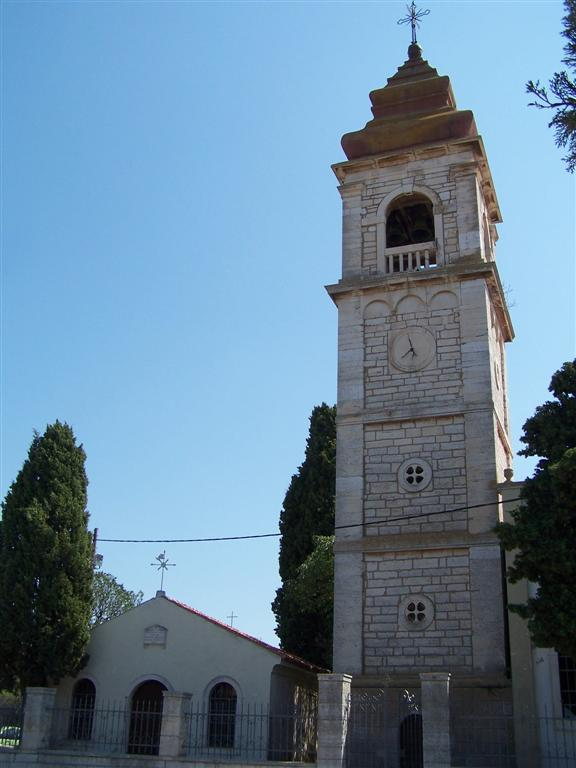
- Saint Spyridon Church, Peroj
- Saint Spyridon Church, Peroj
- Location: Peroj
- Country: Croatia
- Denomination: Serbian Orthodox

History
- Dedication: Saint Spyridon

Architecture
- Years built: 1788

The Saint Spyridon Church (Serbian Cyrillic: Храм светог Спиридона, romanized: Hram svetoga Spiridona; Italian: San Spiridione) is a Serbian Orthodox church in Peroj, Istria, Croatia. The permission to build an Eastern Orthodox church in Peroj was granted by the Republic of Venice in 1788, 130 years after the initial settlement of the local Orthodox community. The church in its current form was completed in 1834.

== See also ==
- List of Serbian Orthodox churches in Croatia
