= Vodnjan =

Vodnjan Dignano
- Town
- Town of Vodnjan; Grad Vodnjan; Città di Dignano
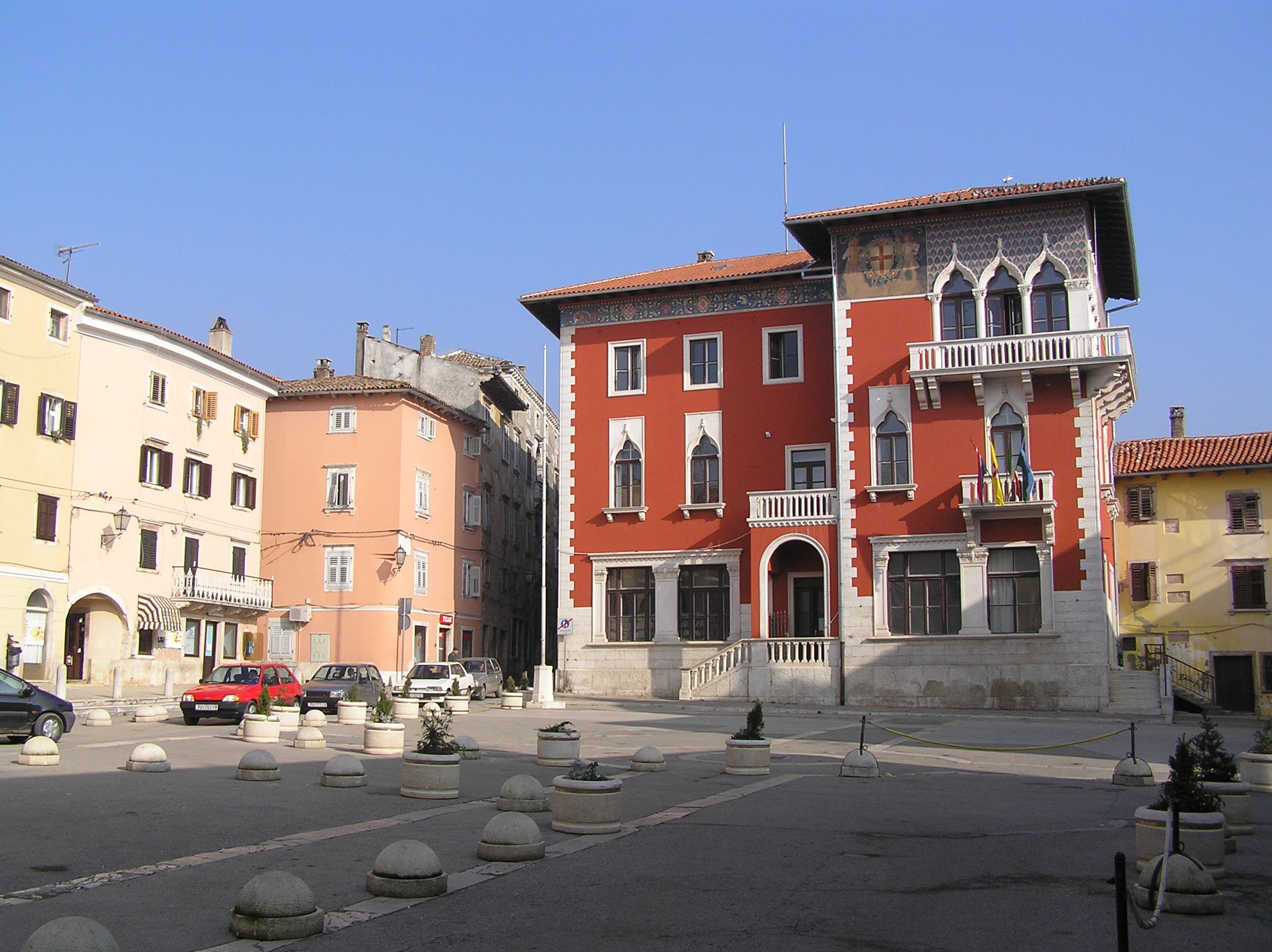
- Vodnjan People's Square

- Flag

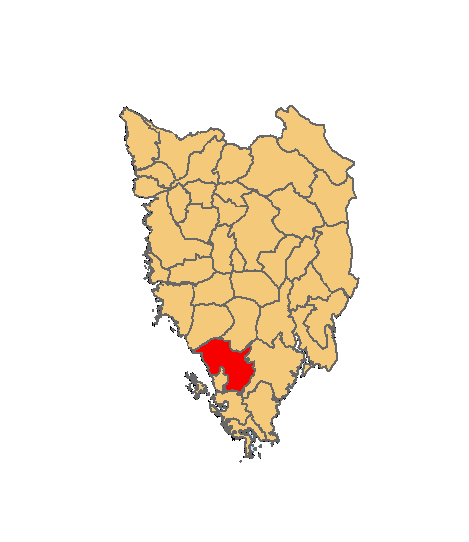
- Location of Vodnjan in Istria

- Location within Croatia
- Coordinates: 44°58′N 13°51′E
- Country: Croatia
- Region: Istria
- County: Istria County

Government
  - Mayor: Igor Orlić

Area
  - Town: 101.0 km^{2} (39.0 sq mi)
  - Urban: 42.9 km^{2} (16.6 sq mi)
- Elevation: 135 m (443 ft)

Population (2021)
  - Town: 5,838
  - Density: 57.80/km^{2} (149.7/sq mi)
  - Urban: 3,133
  - Urban density: 73.0/km^{2} (189/sq mi)
- Demonym: Vodnjanci
- Time zone: UTC+1 (CET)
  - Summer (DST): UTC+2 (CEST)
- Postal code: 52215
- Area code: 052
- Vehicle registration: PU
- Website: vodnjan.hr

Vodnjan (Croatian: [vǒdɲan]; Italian: Dignano previously Dignano d'Istria) is a town in Istria County, west Croatia, located about 10 kilometers north of the largest city in Istria, Pula.

== History ==
According to the legend, it developed out of the association of seven villas which were part of the colonial goods of Pula. Dignano was known as early as Roman times as Vicus Attinianum and listed in historical records in 932 at the time of Pietro Candiniano, to whom the Istrian towns were giving amphorae of good wine in exchange of protection. Inside the historic nucleus, the town preserved its characteristic medieval look with atria and narrow irregularly winding streets among houses, with cobblestoned roads and façades, old streets still impressively recognizable by their Gothic, Venetian Renaissance and Baroque style and many churches rich with memories and art. Among these, St. Jacob Church or delle Trisiere in the old town was designated as a parochial church as early as 1212. It witnessed some important historical events such as the peace agreement with Pula in 1331 and the writing of the Statute of 1492.

The large People's Square in the centre of the town marks the place where a castle with towers was built, probably in the 4th or the 5th century, and torn down in 1808. The square is surrounded by important buildings such as the City Hall in the neo-Gothic style, the Benussi house, the Bembo house and the Bradamante palace with its decorated façade and an elegant triphora.

The square in front of St. Biagio church, which is the biggest church in Istria and built on remnants of an early Romanesque church that was torn down in 1781 is another important and frequently visited square. The church was consecrated in 1800 and it maintains numerous artistically and culturally valuable works, such as a custody in bas relief from 1451, wooden figures and paintings made from the 14th to the 18th centuries, works by great masters like Paolo Veneziano, Jacopo Contarini, Jacobello del Fiore, Lazzaro Bastiani, Gaetano Grezler, Avenerio Trevisano, Antonio della Zonca and others.

The sacred art collection is specialized in numerous relics and the bodies of saints, reliquaries from Murano, habits of the saints and valuable old books. There are many frescos in other churches: St. Margaret Church (the 12th century), Our Lady Traversa Church (the 13th century), St. Kirin Church (the 6th century) or St. Fosca Church (the 8th-9th century), that are destinations for today's pilgrims. The museum in Vodnjan is located in a palace built in 1300, which belonged to the Bettica family. Church of St. Blaža has a bell tower that is the highest in Istria (62 m).

== Demographics ==
According to the 2021 census, its population was 5,838 with 3,133 living in the city proper.

According to the 2011 census, there were 3,613 inhabitants in Vodnjan, with a total municipality population of 6,119. The municipality of Vodnjan has one of the most diverse ethnic compositions, with 3,160 Croats (51.64%), 1,017 Italians (16.62%), 425 Bosniaks (6.95%), 299 Roma (4.89%), 242 Serbs (3.95%) and 96 Montenegrins (1.57%) of the total population. Montenegrins form a majority in Peroj village. 69.2% are Catholics, 14.0% are Muslims and 6.0% are Orthodox Christians. Many old native residents speak an Istriot language they call Bumbaro. These inhabitants are also called Bumbari. However, nowadays "Bumbari" is used by people in neighboring villages to refer to everybody from Vodnjan.

Historical population of Vodnjan–Dignano
| Year | Pop. | ±% |
|---|---|---|
| 1880 | 6,828 | — |
| 1890 | 7,035 | +3.0% |
| 1900 | 7,881 | +12.0% |
| 1910 | 9,066 | +15.0% |
| 1921 | 8,379 | −7.6% |
| 1931 | 8,330 | −0.6% |
| 1948 | 5,609 | −32.7% |
| 1953 | 4,334 | −22.7% |
| 1961 | 6,297 | +45.3% |
| 1971 | 6,259 | −0.6% |
| 1981 | 5,261 | −15.9% |
| 1991 | 5,538 | +5.3% |
| 2001 | 5,651 | +2.0% |
| 2011 | 6,119 | +8.3% |
Source: Naselja i stanovništvo Republike Hrvatske 1857–2001, DZS, Zagreb, 2005

Town of Vodnjan: Population trends 1857–2021
v

| population | 4825 | 5987 | 6828 | 7035 | 7881 | 9066 | 8379 | 8330 | 5609 | 4334 | 6297 | 6259 | 5261 | 5538 | 5651 | 6119 | 5838 |
| | 1857 | 1869 | 1880 | 1890 | 1900 | 1910 | 1921 | 1931 | 1948 | 1953 | 1961 | 1971 | 1981 | 1991 | 2001 | 2011 | 2021 |

Sources: Croatian Bureau of Statistics publications

=== Language ===
Croatian and Italian are both official languages, according to the statute of Vodnjan. Preserving traditional Italian place names and assigning street names to Italian historical figures is legally mandated and carried out.

== Settlements ==
- Gajana / Gaiana, population 172
- Galižana / Gallesano, population 1,501
- Peroj / Peroi, population 833
- Vodnjan / Dignano, population 3,613

== Gallery ==
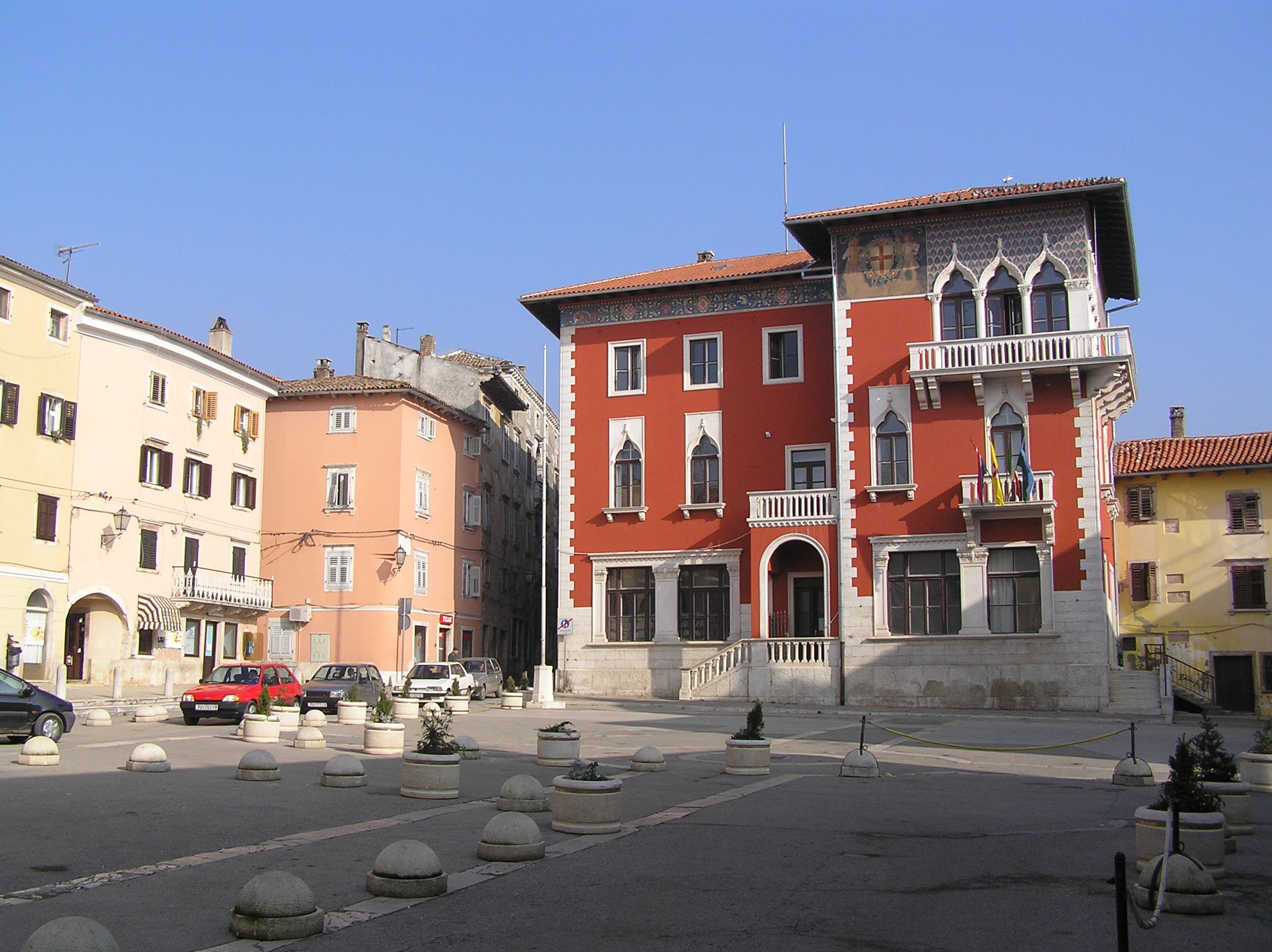
People's Square

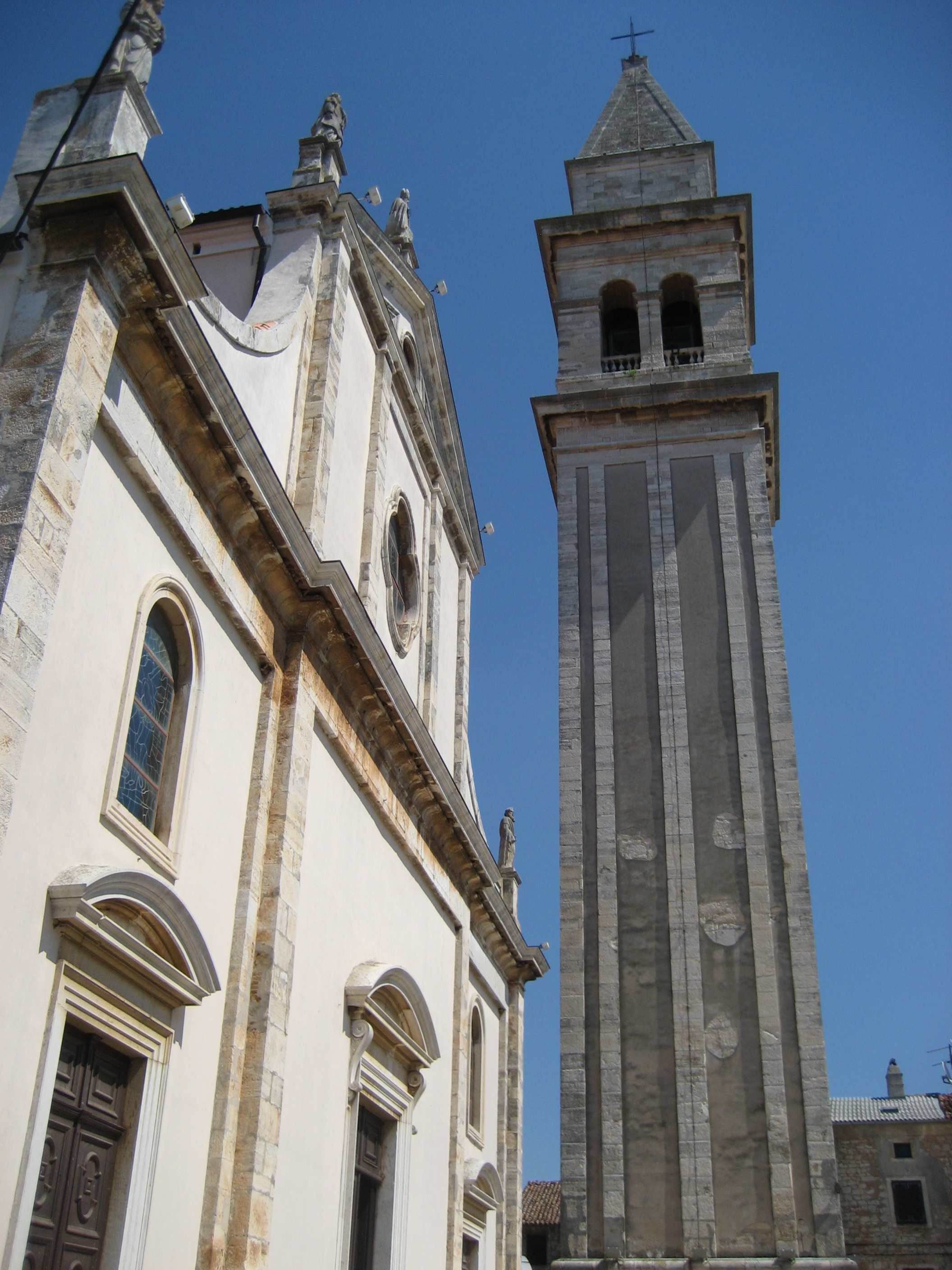
Church and belltower of St.Blaise

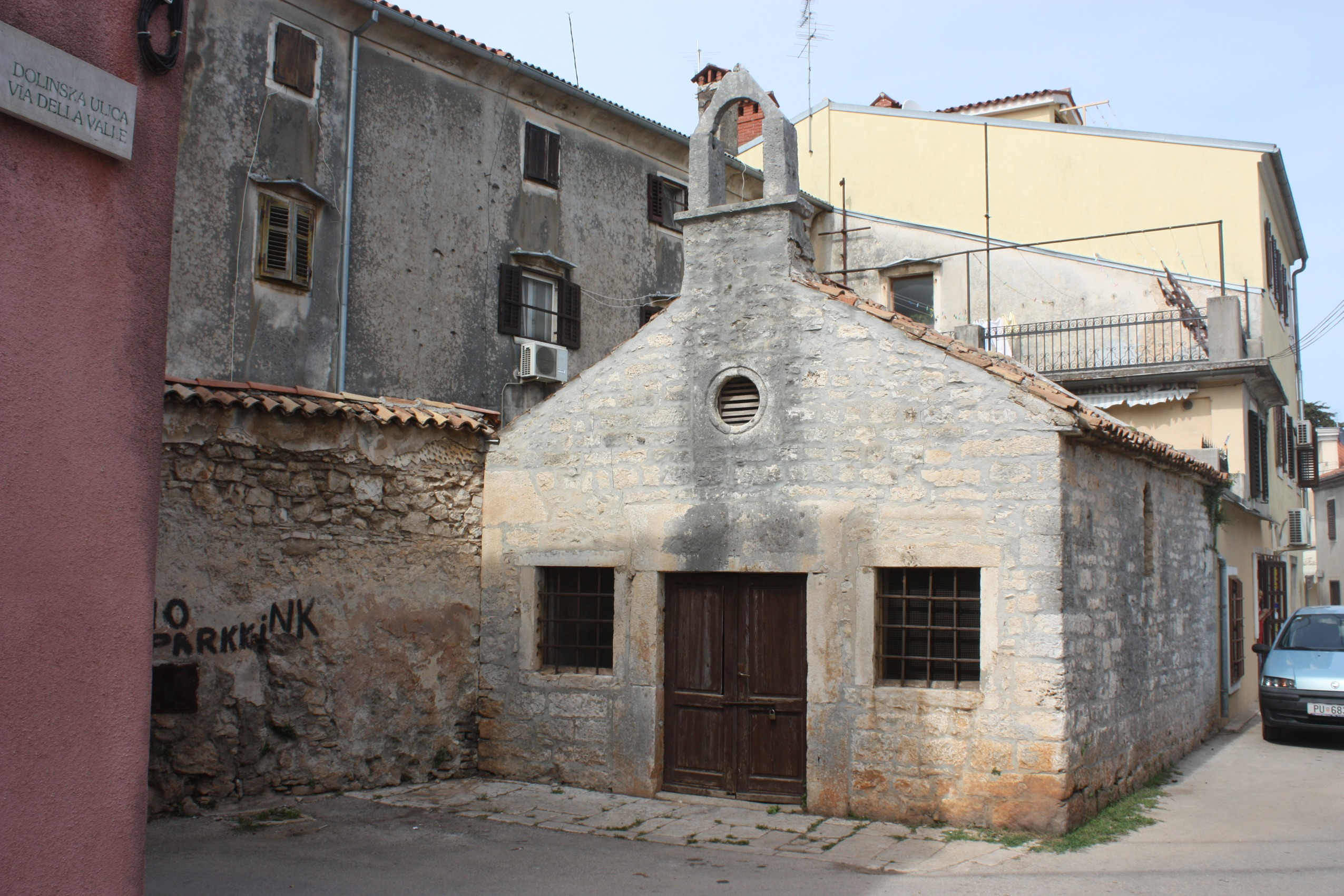
St. Cross Chapel

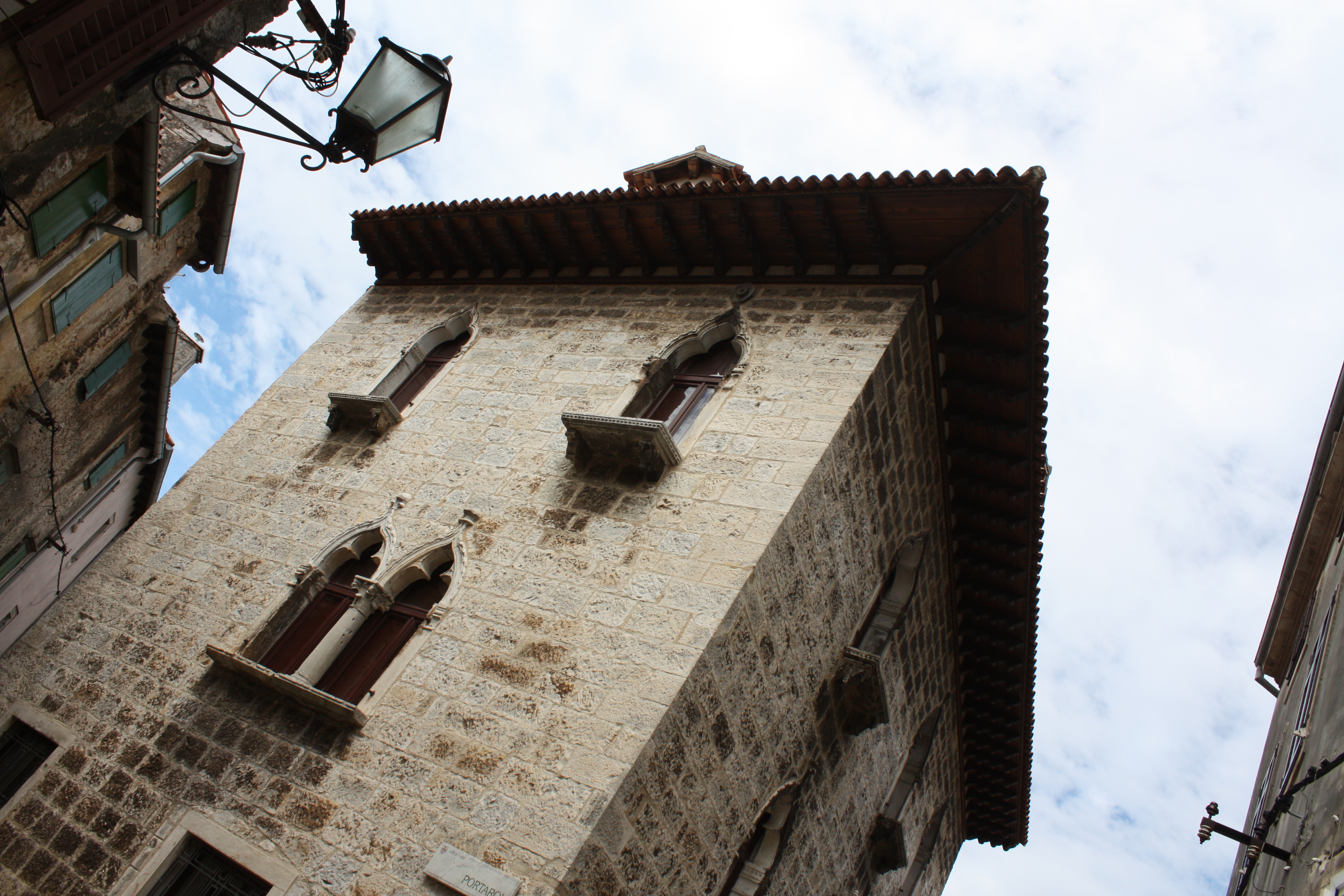
Bettica palace

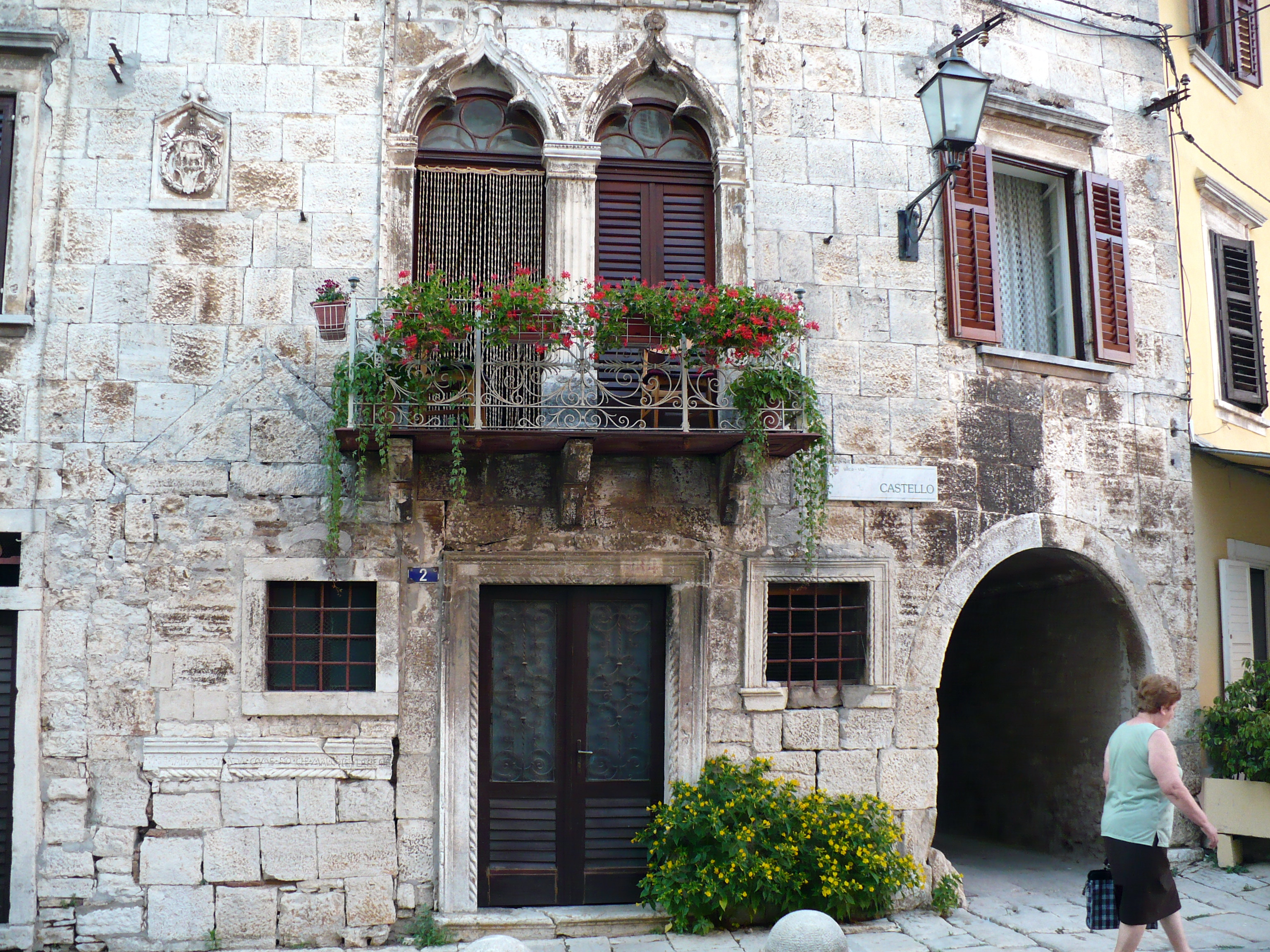
Castello

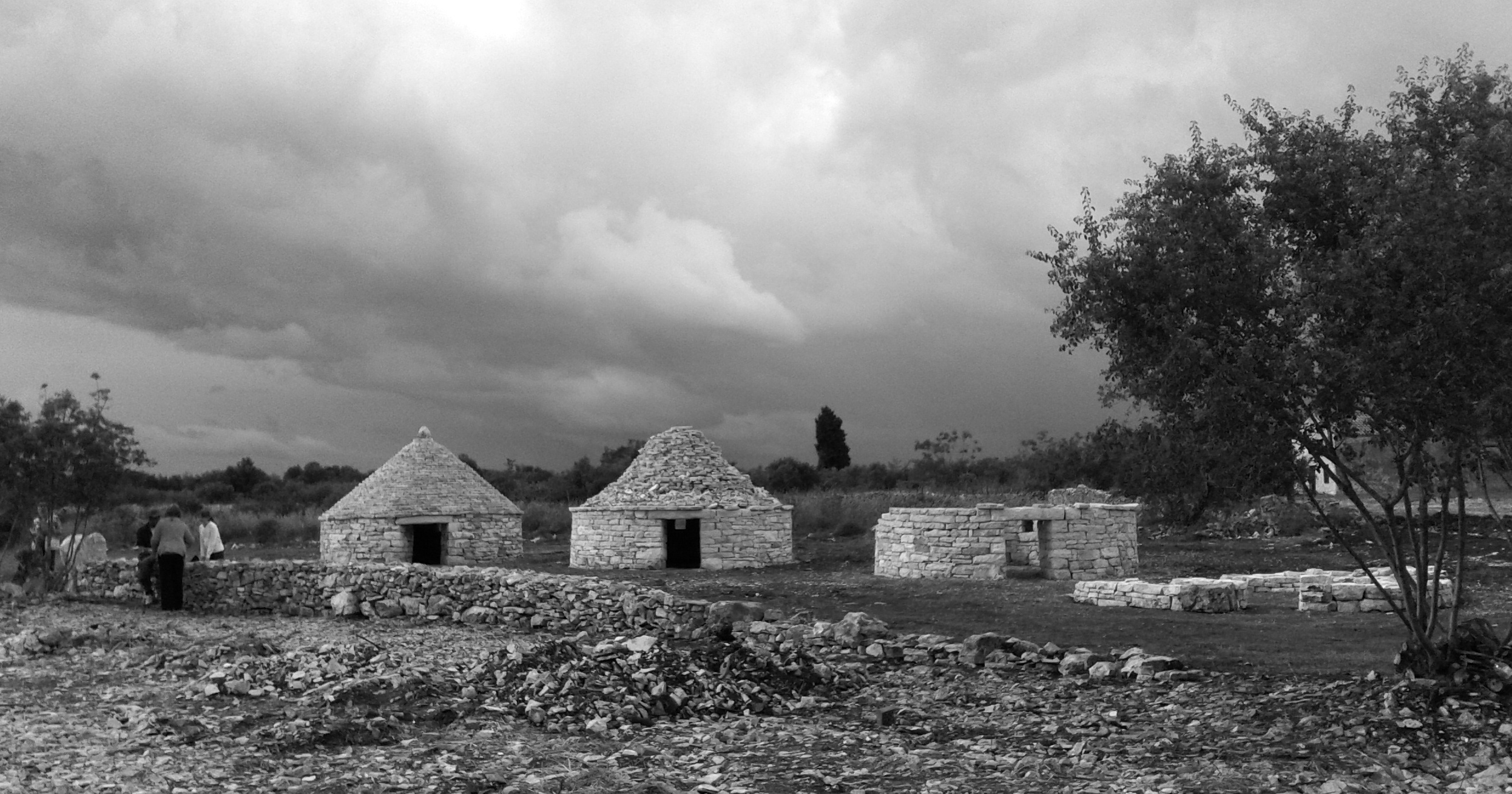
Kažuni (rural buildings)

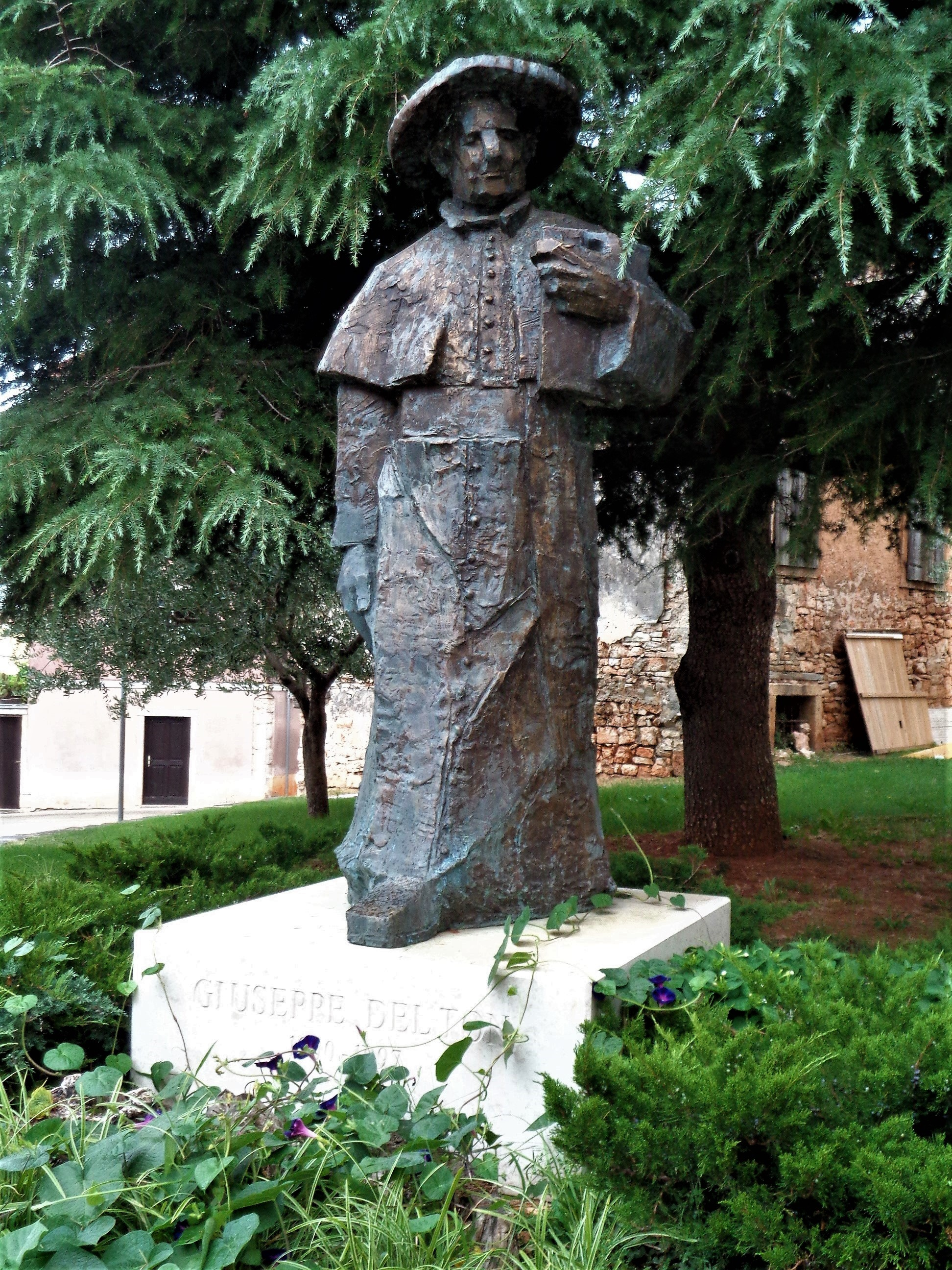
Statue of Giuseppe del Ton, a philologist, priest and writer

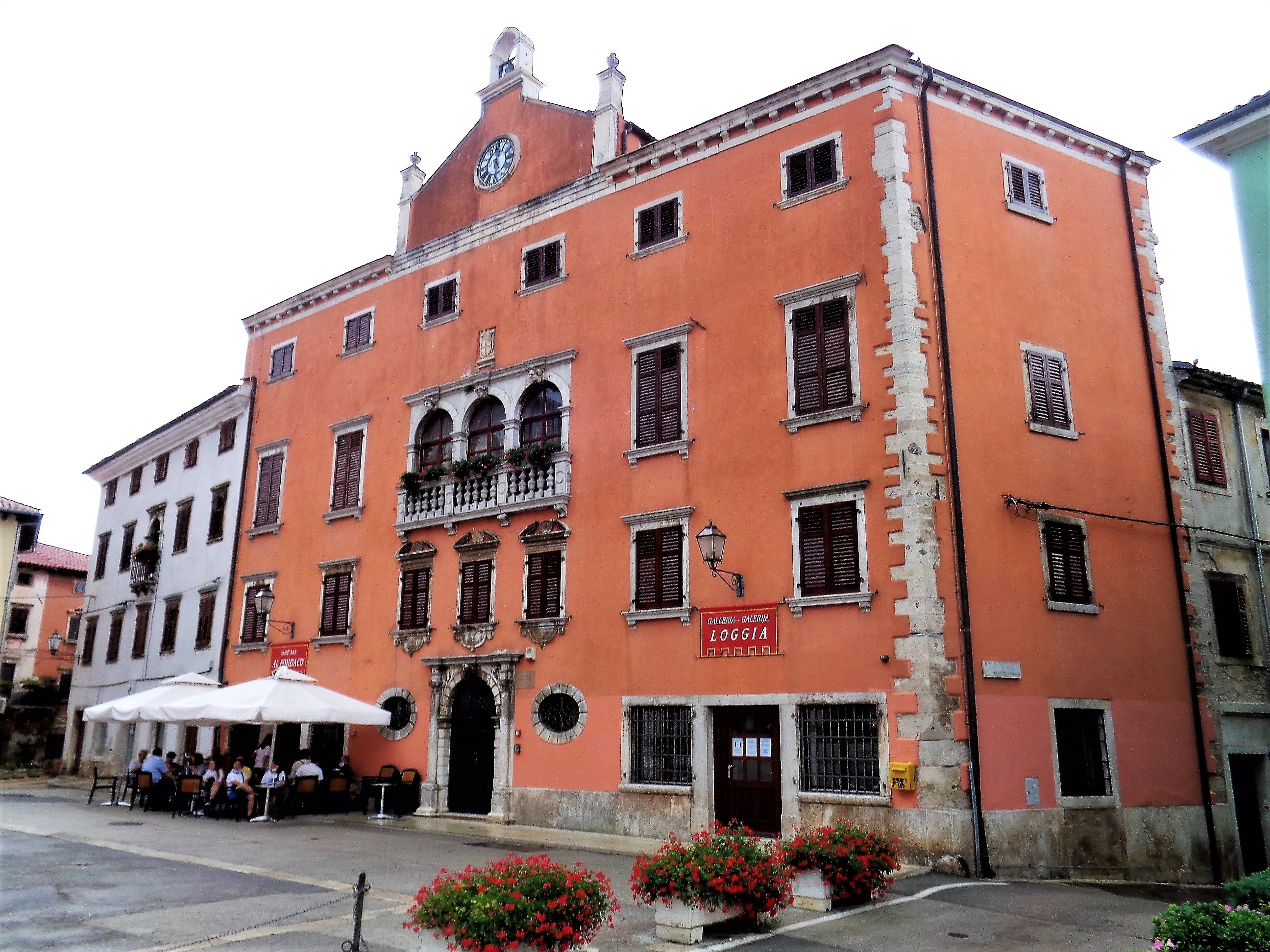
Buildings on the Narodni trg - Piazza del Popolo (People's Square)
