= History of Avignon =

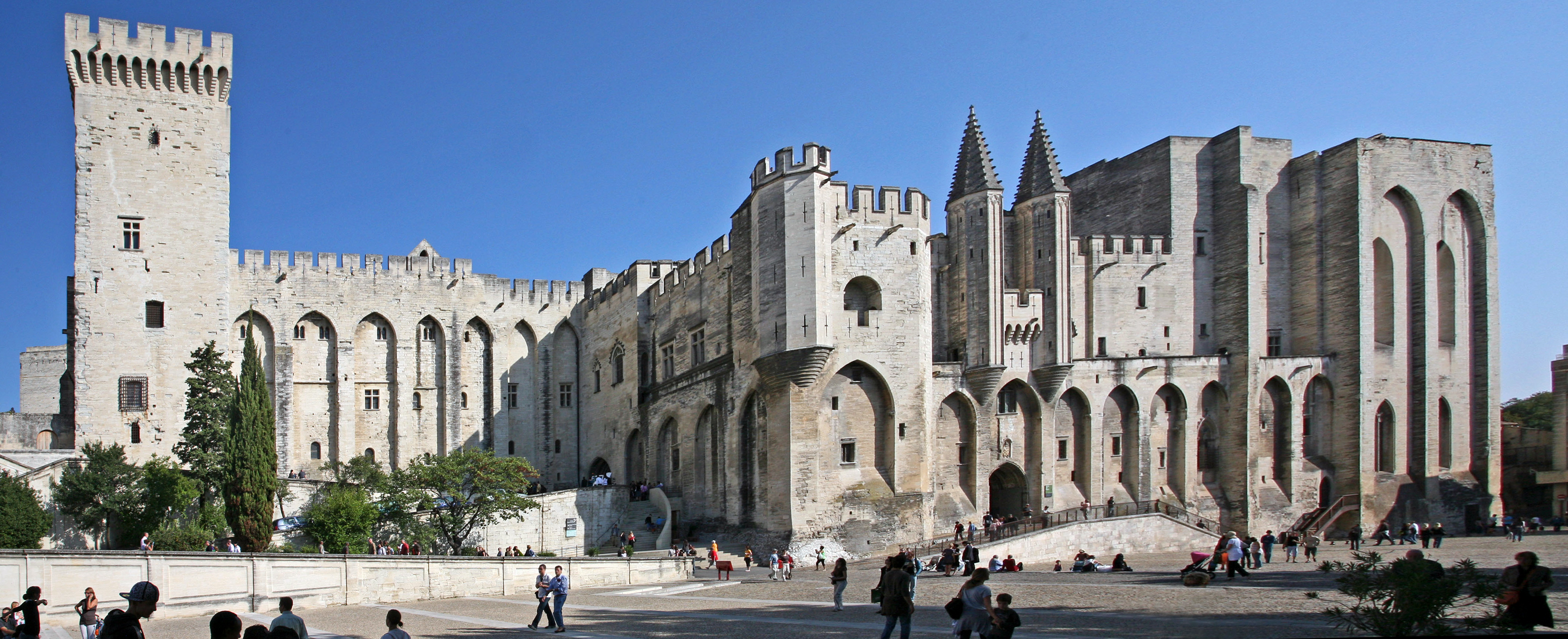
The 14th century papal palace in Avignon

The following is a history of Avignon, France.

== Prehistory ==
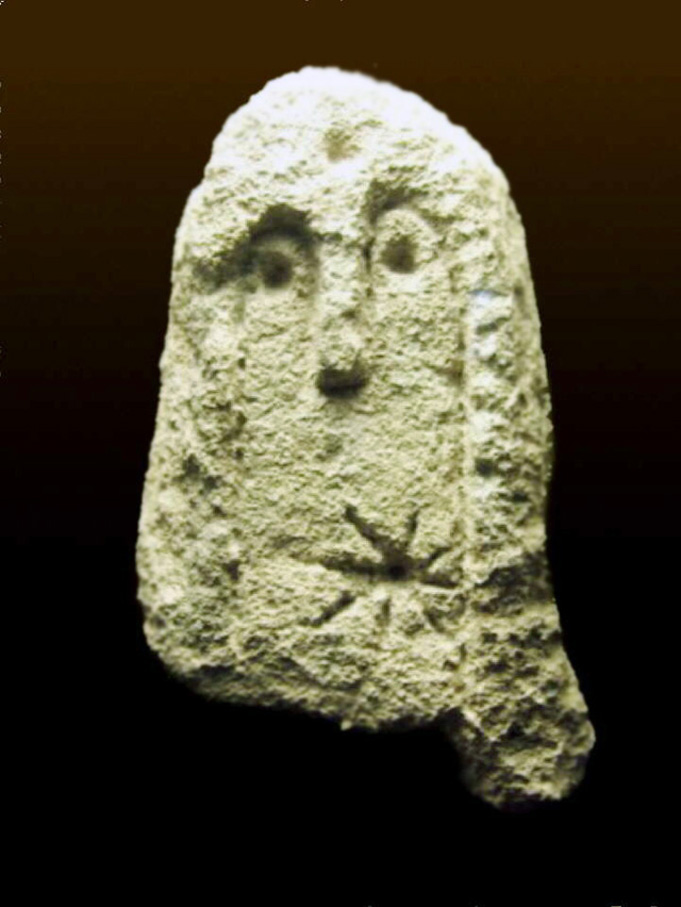
A small anthropomorphic stele discovered during an archaeological excavation on the Rocher des Doms

The site of Avignon has been occupied since the Neolithic period as shown by excavations at Rocher des Doms and the Balance district.

In 1960 and 1961 excavations in the northern part of the Rocher des Doms directed by Sylvain Gagnière uncovered a small anthropomorphic stele (height: 20 cm), which was found in an area of land being reworked. Carved in Burdigalian sandstone, it has the shape of a "tombstone" with its face engraved with a highly stylized human figure with no mouth and whose eyes are marked by small cavities. On the bottom, shifted slightly to the right is a deep indentation with eight radiating lines forming a solar representation - a unique discovery for this type of stele.

Compared to other similar solar figures (Note: Identical solar representations exist existent in rocks and cave sites along the Provençal coast at Mont-Bego, in the Iberian peninsula, and in the Moroccan Sahara.) this stele representing the "first Avignonnais" and comes from the time period between the Copper Age and the Early Bronze Age which is called the southern Chalcolithic. (Note: In Provence, these anthropomorphic stèles (at Lauris, Orgon, Senas, Trets, Goult, Isle-sur-la-Sorgue, and Avignon), date from 3000BC to 2800BC and were from the "civilisation of Lagoza". They were witnesses to an agriculture that became predominant in the lower valleys of the Rhône and the Durance.)

This was confirmed by other findings made in this excavation near the large water reservoir on top of the rock where two polished greenstone axes were discovered, a lithic industry characteristic of "shepherds of the plateaux". There were also some Chalcolithic objects for adornment and an abundance of Hallstatt pottery shards which could have been native or imported (Ionian or Phocaean).

== Antiquity ==
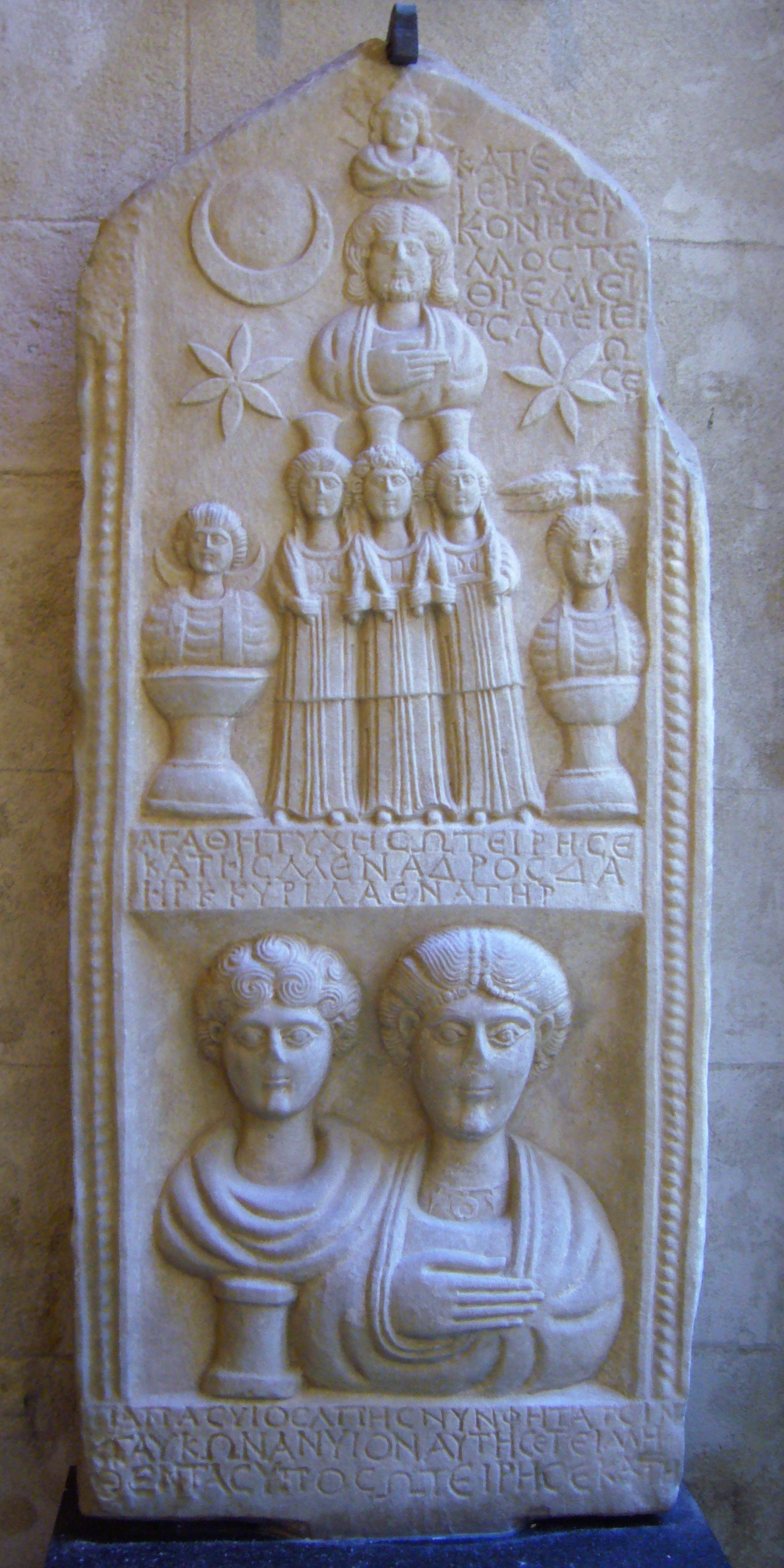
Greek stele from Avignon, at the Lapidary Museum.

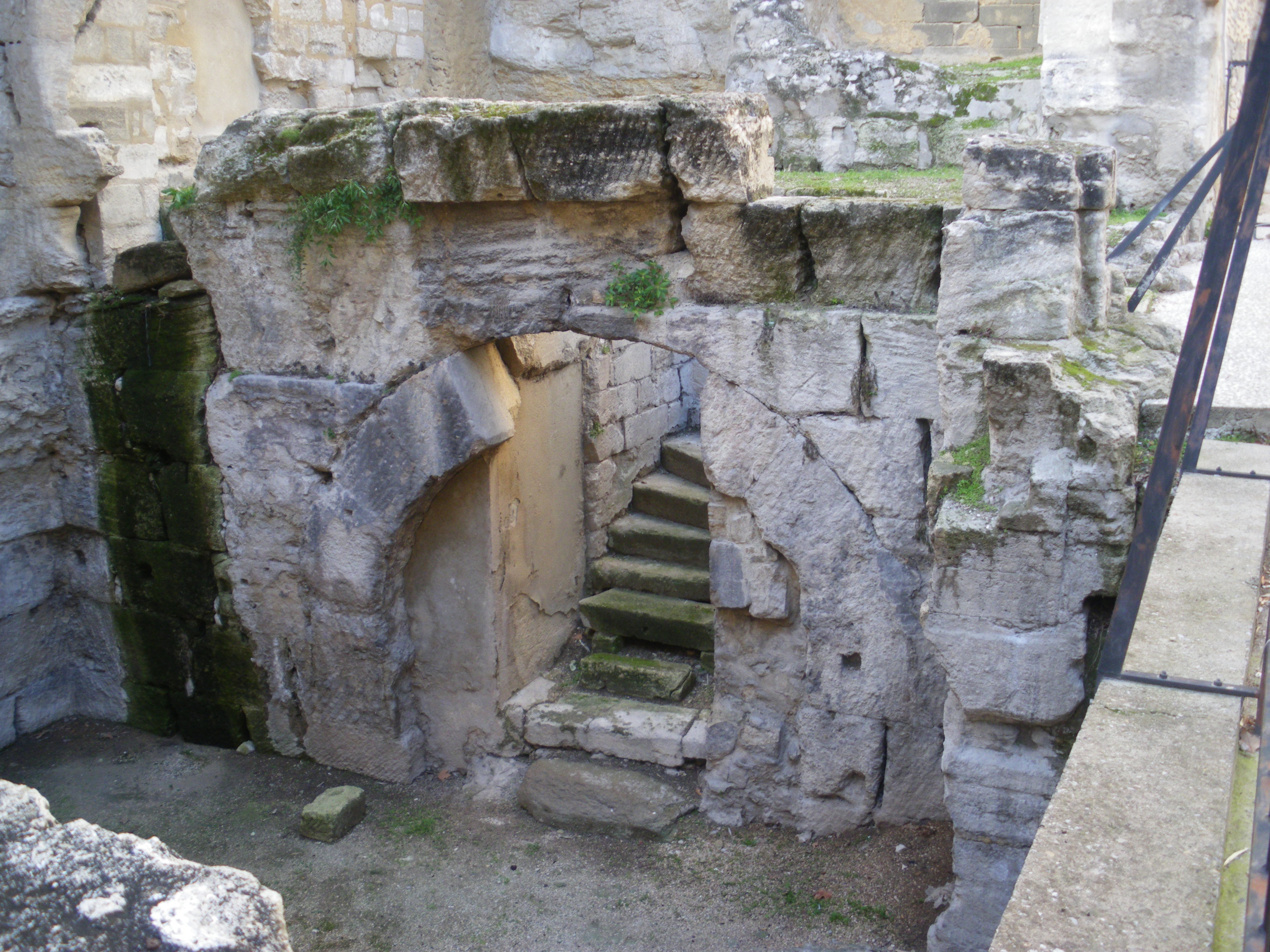
Roman remains from the 1st century, behind the Palais des papes

The name of the city dates back to around the 6th century BC. The first citation of Avignon (Aouen(n)ion) was made by Artemidorus of Ephesus. Although his book, The Journey, is lost it is known from the abstract by Marcian of Heraclea and The Ethnics, a dictionary of names of cities by Stephanus of Byzantium based on that book. He said: "The City of Massalia (Marseille), near the Rhone, the ethnic name (name from the inhabitants) is Avenionsios (Avenionensis) according to the local name (in Latin) and Auenionitès according to the Greek expression". This name has two interpretations: "city of violent wind" or, more likely, "lord of the river". The Celtic tribes named it Auoention around the beginning of the Christian Era. Other sources trace its origin to the Gallic mignon ("marshes") and the Celtic definitive article.

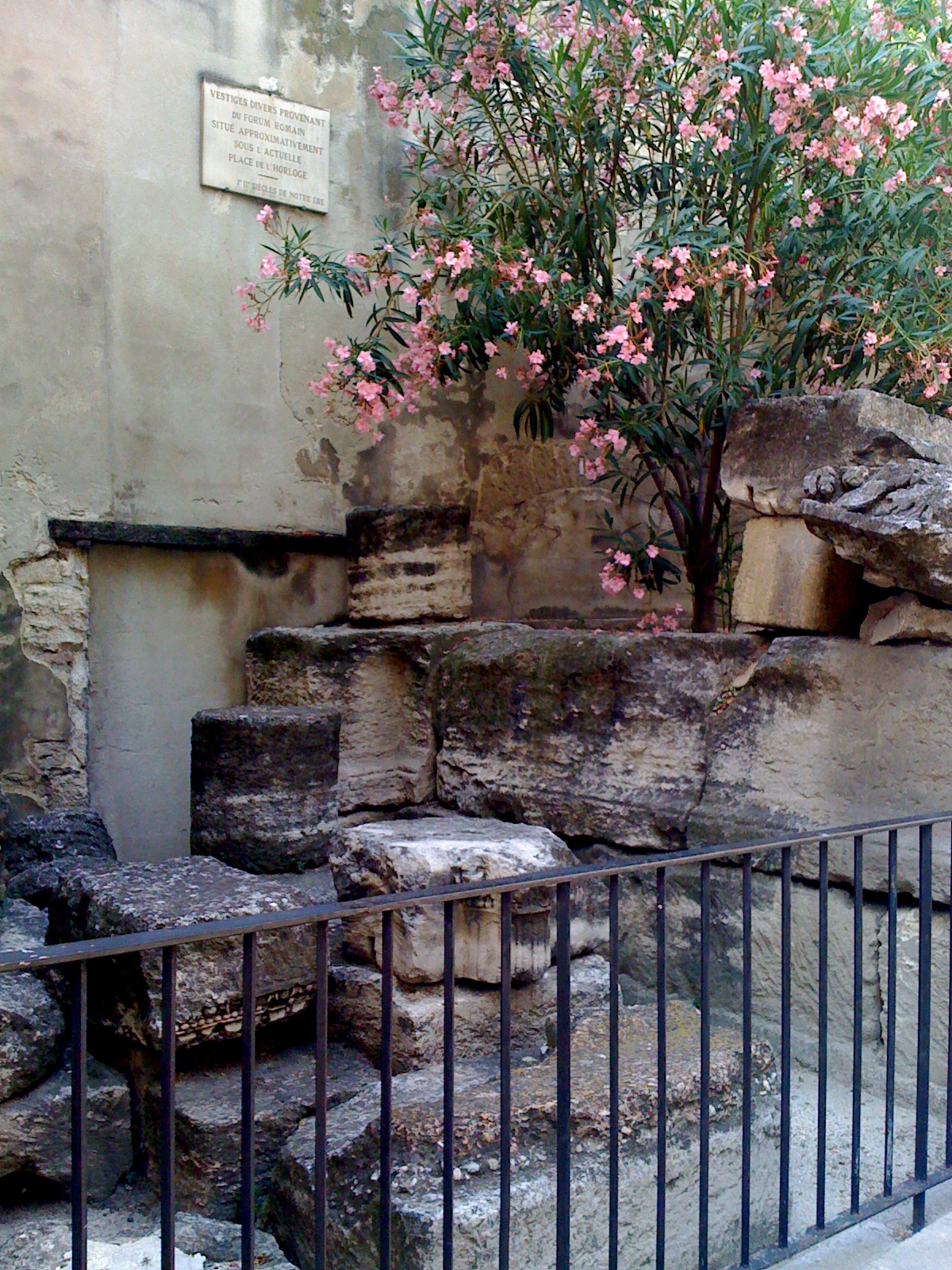
Remains of the Roman forum of Avignon, currently the Place de l'Horloge

Avignon was a simple Greek Emporium founded by Phocaeans from Marseille around 539 BC. It was in the 4th century BC that the Massaliotes (people from Marseilles) began to sign treaties of alliance with some cities in the Rhone valley including Avignon and Cavaillon. A century later Avignon was part of the "region of Massaliotes" (Note: An expression used by the Pseudo-Aristotle in Marvellous Stories) or "country of Massalia". (Note: The name used by Dionysius of Périocète in Description of the inhabited world.)

Fortified on its rock, the city later became and long remained the capital of the Cavares. With the arrival of the Roman legions in 120 BC. the Cavares, allies with the Massaliotes, became Roman. Under the domination of the Roman Empire, Aouenion became Avennio and was now part of Gallia Narbonensis (118 BC.), the first Transalpine province of the Roman Empire. Very little from this period remains (a few fragments of the forum near Rue Molière). It later became part of the 2nd Viennoise. Avignon remained a "federated city" with Marseille until the conquest of Marseille by Trebonius and Decimus Junius Brutus Albinus, Caesar's lieutenants. It became a city of Roman law in 49 BC. It acquired the status of Roman colony in 43 BC. Pomponius Mela placed it among the most flourishing cities of the province.

Over the years 121 and 122 the Emperor Hadrian stayed in the Province where he visited Vaison, Orange, Apt, and Avignon. He gave Avignon the status of a Roman colony: "Colonia Julia Hadriana Avenniensis" and its citizens were enrolled in the tribu.

Following the passage of Maximian, who was fighting the Bagaudes, the Gallic peasants revolted. The first wooden bridge was built over the Rhone linking Avignon to the right bank. It has been dated by dendrochronology to the year 290. In the 3rd century there was a small Christian community outside the walls around what was to become the Abbey of Saint-Ruf.

== Christianity ==
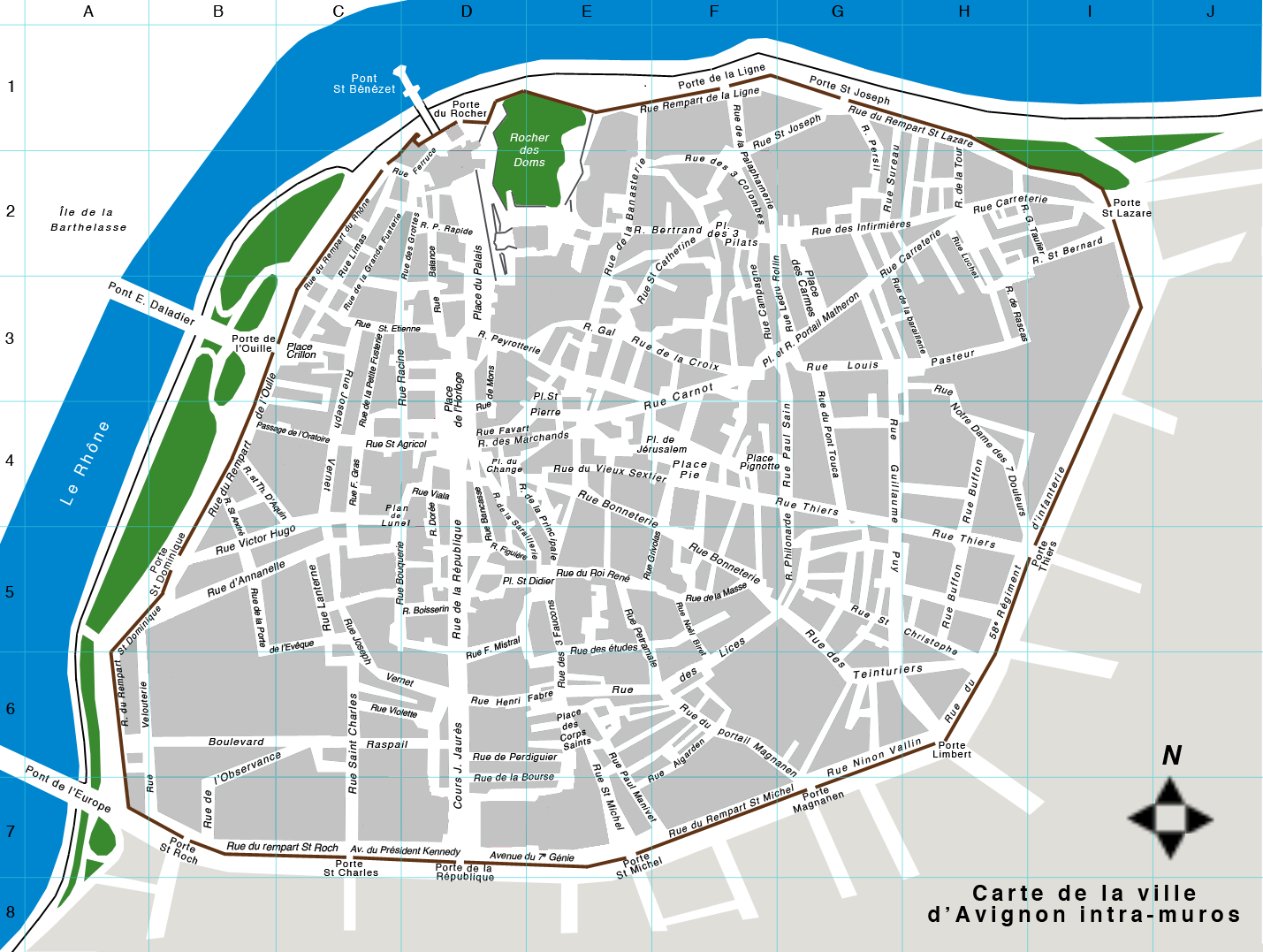
The historical town centre bounded by its walls

Although the date of the Christianization of the city is not known with certainty, it is known that the first evangelizers and prelates were within the hagiographic tradition which is attested by the participation of Nectarius, the first historical Bishop of Avignon (Note: He is sometimes listed as Julius.) on 29 November 439, in the regional council in the Cathedral of Riez assisted by the 13 bishops of the three provinces of Arles.

The memory of St. Eucherius still clings to three vast caves near the village of Beaumont where, it is said, the people of Lyon had to go in search of him in 434 when they sought him to make him their archbishop.

In November 441 Nectarius of Avignon, accompanied by his deacon Fontidius, participated in the Council of Orange convened and chaired by Hilary of Arles where the Council Fathers defined the right of asylum. In the following year, together with his assistants Fonteius and Saturninus, he was at the first Council of Vaison with 17 bishops representing the Seven Provinces. He died in 455. (Note: Nectarius, first historical Bishop of Avignon, went to Rome during his episcopate to arbitrate differences between Hilary of Arles and Pope Leo I.)

== Early Middle Ages ==
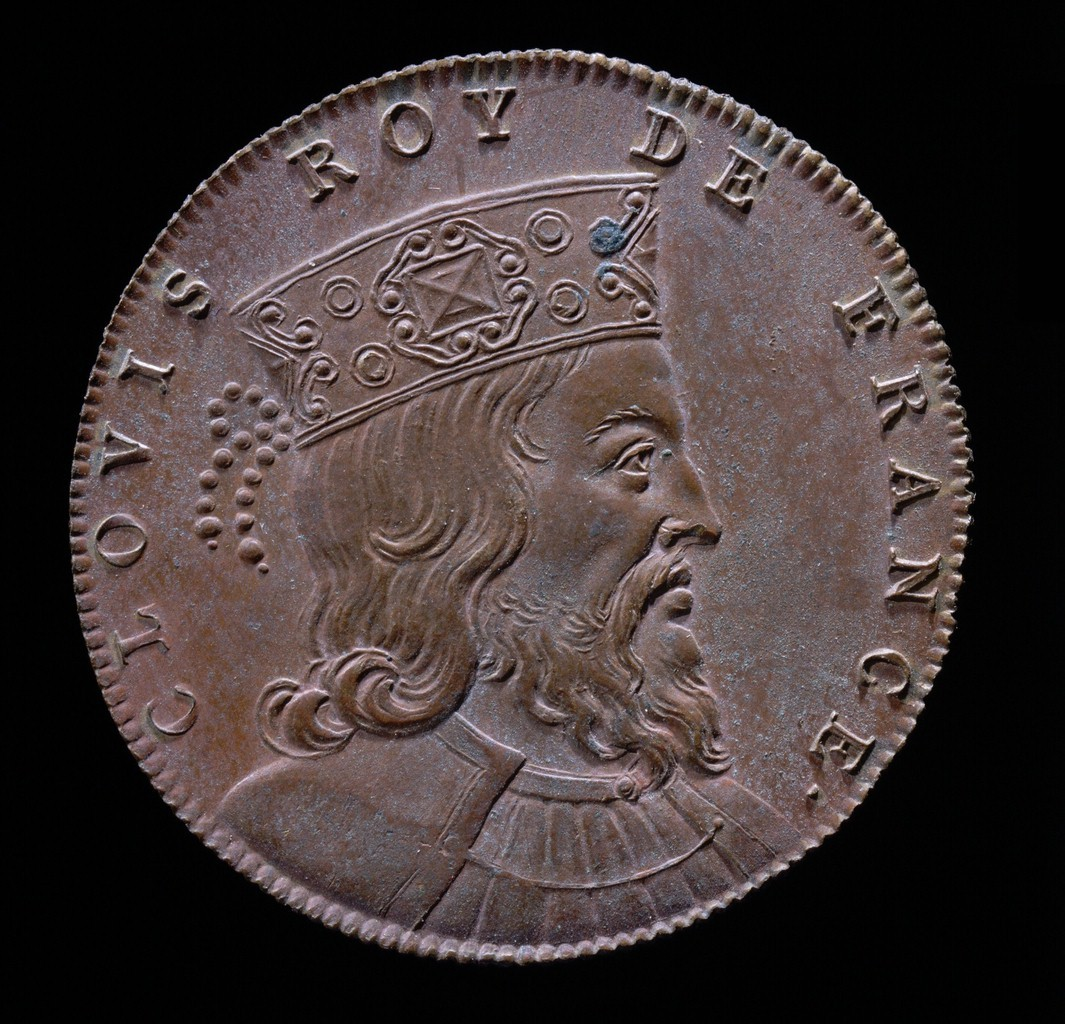
Clovis, King of the Franks, laid siege to Avignon in 500.

Invasions began and during the inroads of the Goths it was heavily damaged. In 472 Avignon was sacked by the Burgundians and replenished by the Patiens, from the city of Lyon, who sent them wheat. (Note: This aid is mentioned in the canons of the Council of the Seven Provinces in Béziers which was held in 472 under the presidency of Sidonius Apollinaris, Bishop of Clermont. The prelate of Lyon also revitalised Arles, Riez, Orange, Saint-Paul-Trois-Châteaux, Alba, and Valence - cities starving from the pillage of the Burgundians.)

In 500 Clovis I, King of the Franks, attacked Gundobad, King of the Burgundians who was accused of the murder of the father of his wife Clotilde. Beaten, Gondebaud left Lyon and took refuge in Avignon with Clovis besieging it. Gregory of Tours reported that the Frankish king devastated the fields, cut down the vines and olive trees, and destroyed the orchards. The Burgundian was saved by the intervention of the Roman General Aredius. He had called him to his aid against the "Frankish barbarians" who ruined the countryside.

In 536 Avignon, following the fate of Provence, was ceded to the Merovingians by Vitiges, the new king of the Ostrogoths. Chlothar I annexed Avignon, Orange, Carpentras, and Gap; Childebert I took Arles and Marseilles; Theudebert I took Aix, Apt, Digne, and Glandevès. The Emperor Justinian I at Constantinople approved the division.

Despite all the invasions, intellectual life continued to flourish on the banks of the Rhône. (Note: Historians have given the name austraso-provençal to the literary circle.) Gregory of Tours noted that after the death of Bishop Antoninus in 561 the Parisian Father Dommole refused the bishopric of Avignon after Chlothar I convinced him that it would be ridiculous "in the middle of tired senators, sophists, and philosophical judges"

St. Magnus was a Gallo-Roman senator who became a monk and then bishop of the city. His son, St. Agricol (Agricolus), bishop between 650 and 700, is the patron saint of Avignon.

The 7th and 8th centuries were the darkest period in the history of Avignon. The city became the prey of the Franks under Theuderic II, King of Austrasia in 612. The Council of Chalon-sur-Saône in 650 was the last to indicate the Episcopal participation of the Provence dioceses. In Avignon there would be no bishop for 205 years with the last known holder being Agricola. (Note: Riez did not have a bishop for 229 years, Vence for 218 years, Saint-Paul-les-Trois-Châteaux and Orange for 189 years (the two dioceses having been united), and both Carpentras and Digne for 138 years.)

In 734 it fell into the hands of the Saracens, and it was destroyed in 737 by the Franks under Charles Martel for having sided with the Saracens against him.

A centralized government was put in place and, in 879, the bishop of Avignon, Ratfred, with other Provençal colleagues, (Note: Of the 23 Provençal seats, only 11 bishops were present.) went to the Synod of Mantaille in Viennois where Boso was elected King of Provence after the death of Louis the Stammerer. (Note: Boson was apparently a Carolingian through Ermangarde, sister of Charles le Chauve.)

The Rhône could again be crossed since in 890 part of the ancient bridge of Avignon was restored at the pier No. 14 near Villeneuve. In that same year Louis, the son of Boson, succeeded his father. His election took place in the Synod of Varennes near Macon. Thibert, who was his most effective supporter, became Count of Apt. In 896 Thibert acted as plenipotentiary of the king at Avignon, Arles, and Marseille with the title of "Governor-General of all the counties of Arles and Provence". Two years later, at his request, King Louis donated Bédarrides to the priest Rigmond d'Avignon.

On 19 October 907 King Louis the Blind became emperor (Note: Louis the Blind, son of Boson I, was King of Provence from 890 to 928. He became King of Italy in 900 then was crowned Emperor of the Holy Roman Empire in February 901 in Rome by Pope Benedict IV. His rival, the Italian Béranger de Frioul made him put out his eyes in 905 for perjury.) and restored an island in the Rhone to Remigius, Bishop of Avignon. This charter is the first mention of a cathedral dedicated to Mary. (Note: Ecclesia suae in honore Sancte Marie Dei genitris dicatae noted the cartulary of Notre-Dame of Doms.)

After the capture and the execution of his cousin, Louis III, who had been exiled to Italy in 905, Hugh of Arles became regent and personal advisor to King Louis. He exercised most of the powers of the king of Provence and in 911, when Louis III gave him the titles of Duke of Provence and Marquis of the Viennois, he left Vienne and moved to Arles which was the original seat of his family and which now was the new capital of Provence.

On 2 May 916 Louis the Blind restored the churches of Saint-Ruf and Saint-Géniès to the diocese of Avignon. On the same day Bishop Fulcherius attested in favour of his canons and for the two churches of Notre-Dame and Saint-Étienne to form a cathedral. (Note: These were noted in the Cartulary of Notre-Dame of Doms: genetrici ejus regine celorum et terre interemate Marie virgini protomartyri etiam beatissimo Stephano. On 18 August 918 Louis the Blind, in a diploma of new restitution in favour of Fulcherius, mentioned the cathedral complex of Avignon with two churches and a baptistry: "Matris ecclesie Sancte Marie et Sancti Stephami ac Sancti Johannis Baptiste".)

A political event of importance took place in 932 with the reunion of the kingdom of Provence with Upper Burgundy. This union formed the Kingdom of Burgundy in which Avignon was one of the largest cities.

At the end of the 9th century, Muslim Spain installed a military base in Fraxinet (Note: Fraxinetum has been identified as Garde-Freinet.) since they had led the plundering expeditions in the Alps throughout the 10th century.

During the night of 21 to 22 July 972 the Muslims took dom Mayeul, (Note: Maïeul was the younger son of Foucher de Valensole, one of the richest lords in Provincia, and Raymonde, daughter of Count Maïeul I of Narbonne, who were married at Avignon.) the Abbot of Cluny who was returning from Rome, prisoner. They asked for one livre for each of them which came to 1,000 livres, a huge sum, which was paid to them quickly. Maïeul was released in mid-August and returned to Cluny in September.

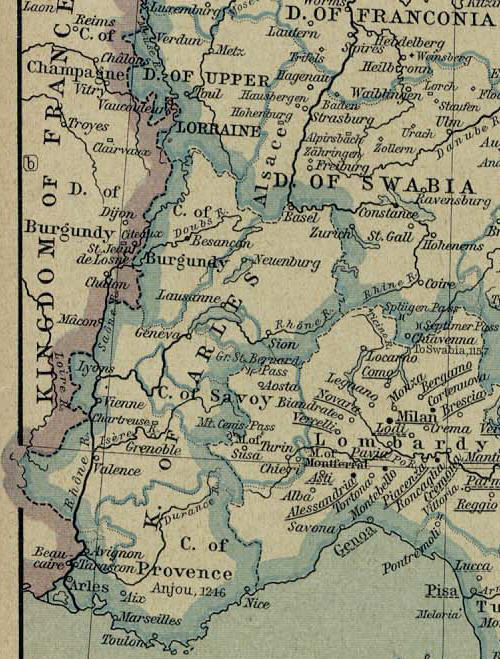
Map of the Kingdom of Burgundy, which was attached to the Holy Roman Empire in 1003.

In September 973 William I of Provence and his brother Rotbold, sons of the Count of Avignon, Boso II, mobilized all the nobles of Provence on behalf of dom Maïeul. With the help of Ardouin, Marquis of Turin, and after two weeks of siege, Provençal troops chased the Saracens from their hideouts in Fraxinet and Ramatuelle as well as those at Peirimpi near Noyers in the Jabron valley. William and Roubaud earned their title of Counts of Provence. William had his seat at Avignon and Roubaud at Arles.

In 976 while Bermond, brother-in-law of Eyric (Note: Eyric was the eldest son of Foucher de Valensole and of Raymonde de Narbonne and it was his son Humbert de Caseneuve that the noble house of Agoult-Simiane came.) was appointed Viscount of Avignon by King Conrad the Peaceful on 1 April, the Cartulary of Notre-Dame des Doms in Avignon says that Bishop Landry restored rights that had been unjustly appropriated to the canons of Saint-Étienne. He gave them a mill and two houses he built for them on the site of the current Trouillas Tower at the papal palace. In 980 these canons were constituted in a canonical chapter by Bishop Garnier.

In 994 Dom Maïeul arrived in Avignon where his friend William the Liberator was dying. He assisted in his last moments on the island facing the city (the Île de la Barthelasse) on the Rhone. The Count had as successor the son he had by his second wife Alix. He would reign jointly with his uncle Rotbold under the name William II. In the face of County and episcopal power, the town of Avignon organized itself. Towards the year 1000 there was already a proconsul Béranger with his wife Gilberte who are known to have founded an abbey at "Castrum Caneto". (Note: Castrum Caneto corresponds to Cannet-des-Maures.)

In 1032 when Conrad II inherited the Kingdom of Burgundy, Avignon was attached to the Holy Roman Empire. The Rhone was now a border that could only be crossed on the old bridge at Avignon. Some Avignon people still use the term "Empire Land" to describe the Avignon side, and "Kingdom Land" to designate the Villeneuve side to the west which was in the possession of the King of France.

== Late Middle Ages ==
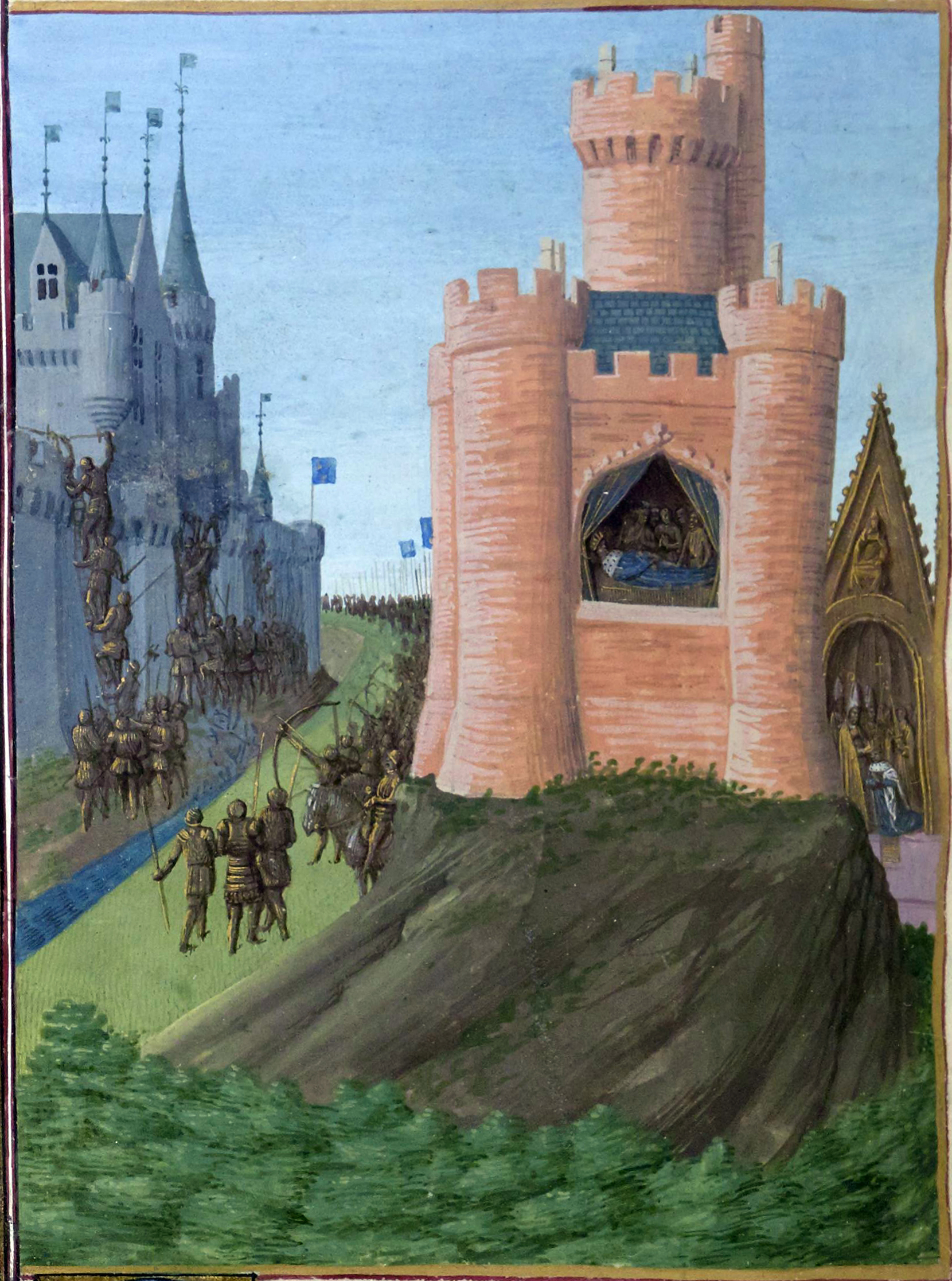
The Siege of Avignon in 1226 (on the left), the death of Louis VIII the Lion and crowning of Louis IX (on the right).

After the division of the empire of Charlemagne, Avignon came within the Kingdom of Burgundy, and was owned jointly by the Count of Provence and the Count of Toulouse. From 1060, the Count of Forcalquier also had nominal overlordship, until these rights were resigned to the local Bishops and Consuls in 1135.

With the German rulers at a distance, Avignon set up an autonomous administration with the creation of a consulat in 1129, two years before its neighbour Arles.

In 1209 the Council of Avignon ordered a second excommunication for Raymond VI of Toulouse.

At the end of the twelfth century, Avignon declared itself an independent republic, and sided with Raymond VII of Toulouse during the Albigensian Crusade. In 1226, the citizens refused to open the gates of Avignon to King Louis VIII of France and the papal legate. They besieged the city for three months (10 June-12 September). Avignon was captured and forced to pull down its city walls and fill up its moat.

At the end of September, a few days after the surrender of the city to the troops of King Louis VIII, Avignon experienced severe flooding.

In 1249 the city again declared itself a republic on the death of Raymond VII, his heirs being on a crusade.

On 7 May 1251, however, the city was forced to submit to two younger brothers of King Louis IX, Alphonse of Poitiers and Charles of Anjou (Charles I of Naples). They were heirs through the female line of the Marquis and Count of Provence, and thus co-lords of the city. After the death of Alphonse in 1271, Philip III of France inherited his share of Avignon and passed it to his son Philip the Fair in 1285. It passed in turn in 1290 to Charles II of Naples, who thereafter remained the sole lord of the entire city.

The University of Avignon was founded by Pope Boniface VIII in 1303 and was famed as a seat of legal studies, flourishing until the French Revolution (1792).

== Avignon papacy ==
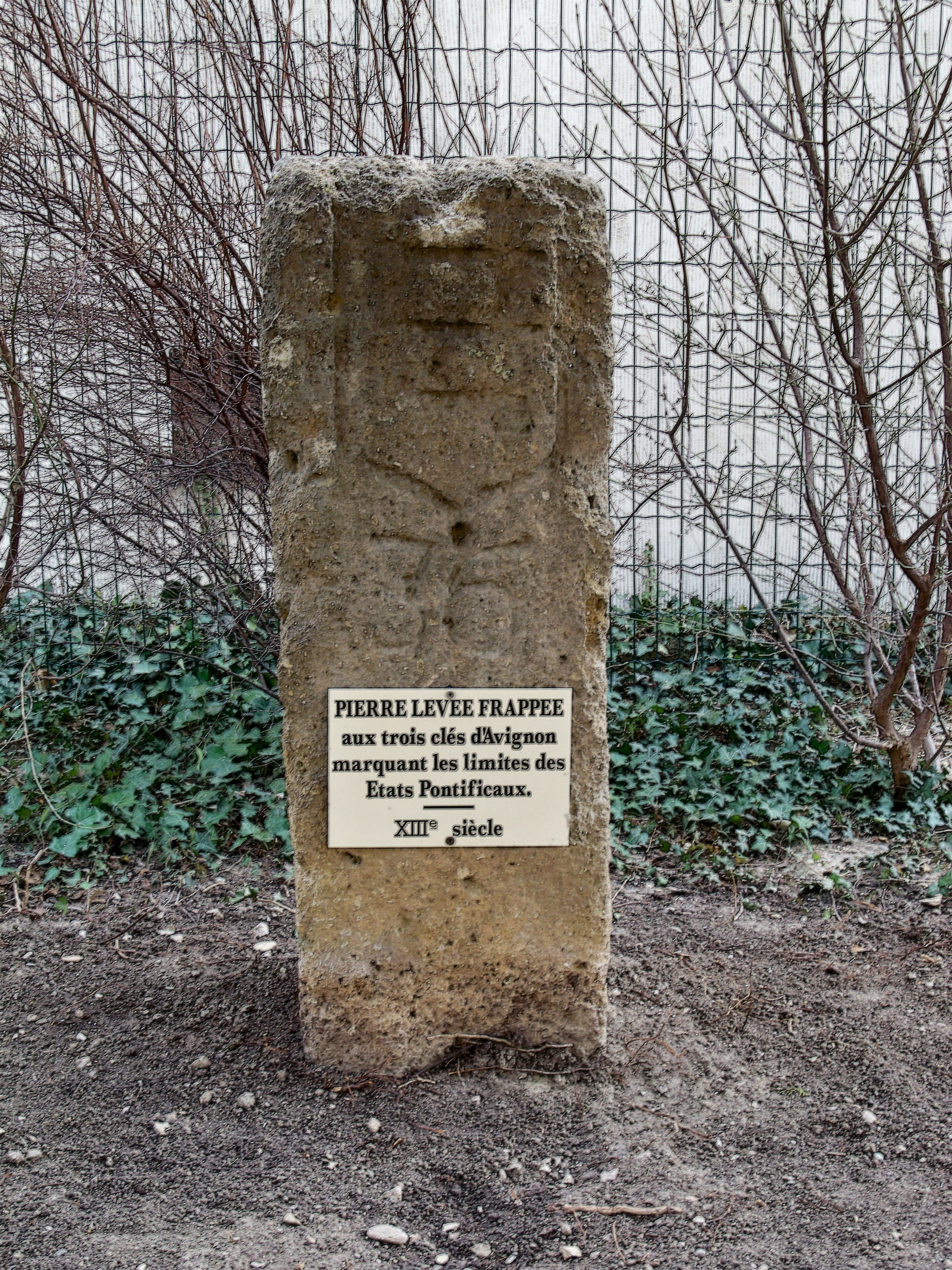
Milestone delineating the limit of the Papal State and the Comtat Venaissin

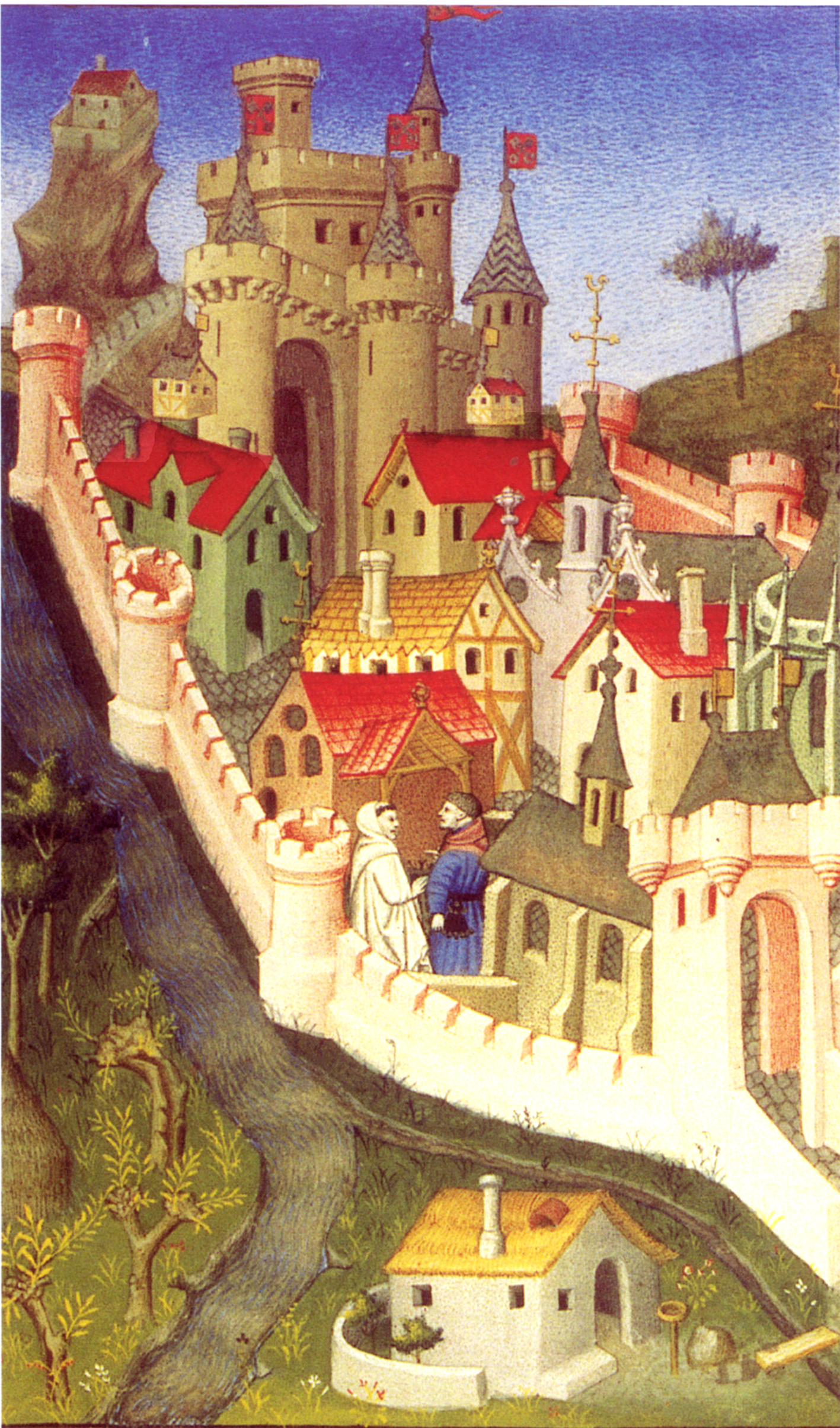
Palais des papes and the city of Avignon, by the Boucicaut Master at the beginning of the 15th century.

In 1309 the city, still part of the Kingdom of Arles (as the Kingdom of Burgundy was known by then), was chosen by Pope Clement V as his residence at the time of the Council of Vienne and, from 9 March 1309 until 13 January 1377, Avignon, rather than Rome, was the seat of the Papacy. At the time the city and its surroundings (the Comtat Venaissin) were ruled by the kings of Sicily of the House of Anjou. The French King Philip the Fair, who had inherited from his father all the rights of Alphonse de Poitiers (the last Count of Toulouse), made them over to Charles II, King of Naples and Count of Provence (1290). Nonetheless, Philip was a shrewd ruler. Inasmuch as the eastern banks of the Rhône marked the edge of his kingdom, when the river flooded up into the city of Avignon Philip taxed the city, because during periods of flood it technically lay within his domain.

Avignon became the Pontifical residence under Pope Clement V in 1309. His successor, John XXII, a former bishop of the diocese, made it the capital of Christianity and transformed his former episcopal palace into the primary Palace of the Popes. It was Benedict XII who built the Old Palace and his successor Clement VI the New Palace. He bought the town on 9 June 1348 from Joanna I of Naples, the Queen of Naples and Countess of Provence for 80,000 florins. Innocent VI endowed the city walls.

Under their rule, the Court grew and attracted many merchants, painters, sculptors and musicians. The palace became the most remarkable building in the International Gothic style. It was the result, in its construction and ornamentation, of the joint work of the best French architects, Pierre Peysson and Jean du Louvres (called Loubières) and the larger frescoes from the School of Siena: Simone Martini and Matteo Giovanetti.

The papal library in Avignon was the largest in Europe in the 14th century, with 2,000 volumes. Around the library were a group of passionate clerics of letters who were pupils of Petrarch, the founder of Humanism. At the same time the Clementine Chapel, called the Grande Chapelle, attracted composers, singers, and musicians including Philippe de Vitry, inventor of the Ars Nova, and Johannes Ciconia.

As Bishop of Cavaillon, Cardinal Philippe de Cabassoles, Lord of Vaucluse, was the great protector of the Renaissance poet Petrarch.

Urban V took the first decision to return to Rome, to the delight of Petrarch, but the chaotic situation there with different conflicts prevented him from staying there. He died shortly after his return to Avignon.

His successor, Gregory XI, also decided to return to Rome and this ended the first period of the Avignon Papacy. When Gregory XI brought the seat of the papacy to Rome in 1377, the city of Avignon was administered by a legate.

The early death of Gregory XI, however, prompted the Western Schism. Antipopes Clement VII and Benedict XIII reigned again in Avignon. Overall, therefore, it was seven popes and two antipopes who succeeded in the papal palace and enriched themselves during their pontificates.

From then on until the French Revolution, Avignon and the Comtat were papal possessions: first under the schismatic popes of the Great Schism, then under the popes of Rome ruling via legates until 1542, and then by vice-legates. The Black Death appeared at Avignon in 1348 killing almost two-thirds of the city's population.

In all seven popes and two antipopes resided in Avignon:

- Clement V: 1305–1314 (curia moved to Avignon March 9, 1309)
- John XXII: 1316–1334
- Benedict XII: 1334–1342
- Clement VI: 1342–1352
- Innocent VI: 1352–1362
- Urban V: 1362–1370 (in Rome 1367-1370; returned to Avignon 1370)
- Gregory XI: 1370–1378 (left Avignon to return to Rome on September 13, 1376)

Antipopes

- Clement VII (1378-1394)
- Benedict XIII (1394-1403)

The walls that were built by the popes in the years immediately following the acquisition of Avignon as papal territory are well preserved. As they were not particularly strong fortifications, the Popes relied instead on the immensely strong fortifications of their palace, the "Palais des Papes". This immense Gothic building, with walls 17–18 feet thick, was built 1335–1364 on a natural spur of rock, rendering it all but impregnable to attack. After its capture following the French Revolution, it was used as a barracks and prison for many years but it is now a museum.

Avignon, which at the beginning of the 14th century was a town of no great importance, underwent extensive development during the time the seven Avignon popes and two anti-popes, Clement V to Benedict XIII, resided there. To the north and south of the rock of the Doms, partly on the site of the Bishop's Palace that had been enlarged by John XXII, was built the Palace of the Popes in the form of an imposing fortress consisting of towers linked to each other and named as follows: La Campane, Trouillas, La Glacière, Saint-Jean, Saints-Anges (Benedict XII), La Gâche, La Garde-Robe (Clement VI), Saint-Laurent (Innocent VI). The Palace of the Popes belongs, by virtue of its severe architecture, to the Gothic art of the South of France. Other noble examples can be seen in the churches of Saint-Didier, Saint-Pierre, and Saint Agricol as well as in the Clock Tower and in the fortifications built between 1349 and 1368 for a distance of some three miles (4.8 km) flanked by thirty-nine towers, all of which were erected or restored by the Roman Catholic Church.

The popes were followed to Avignon by agents (or factors) of the great Italian banking-houses who settled in the city as money-changers and as intermediaries between the Apostolic Camera and its debtors. They lived in the most prosperous quarter of the city which was known as the Exchange. A crowd of traders of all kinds brought to market the produce necessary for maintaining the numerous courts and for the visitors who flocked to it: grain and wine from Provence, the south of France, Roussillon, and the country around Lyon. Fish was brought from places as distant as Brittany; rich cloth and tapestries came from Bruges and Tournai. The account-books of the Apostolic Camera, which are still kept in the Vatican archives, give an idea of the trade of which Avignon became the centre. The university founded by Boniface VIII in 1303 had many students under the French popes. They were drawn there by the generosity of the sovereign pontiffs who rewarded them with books or benefices.

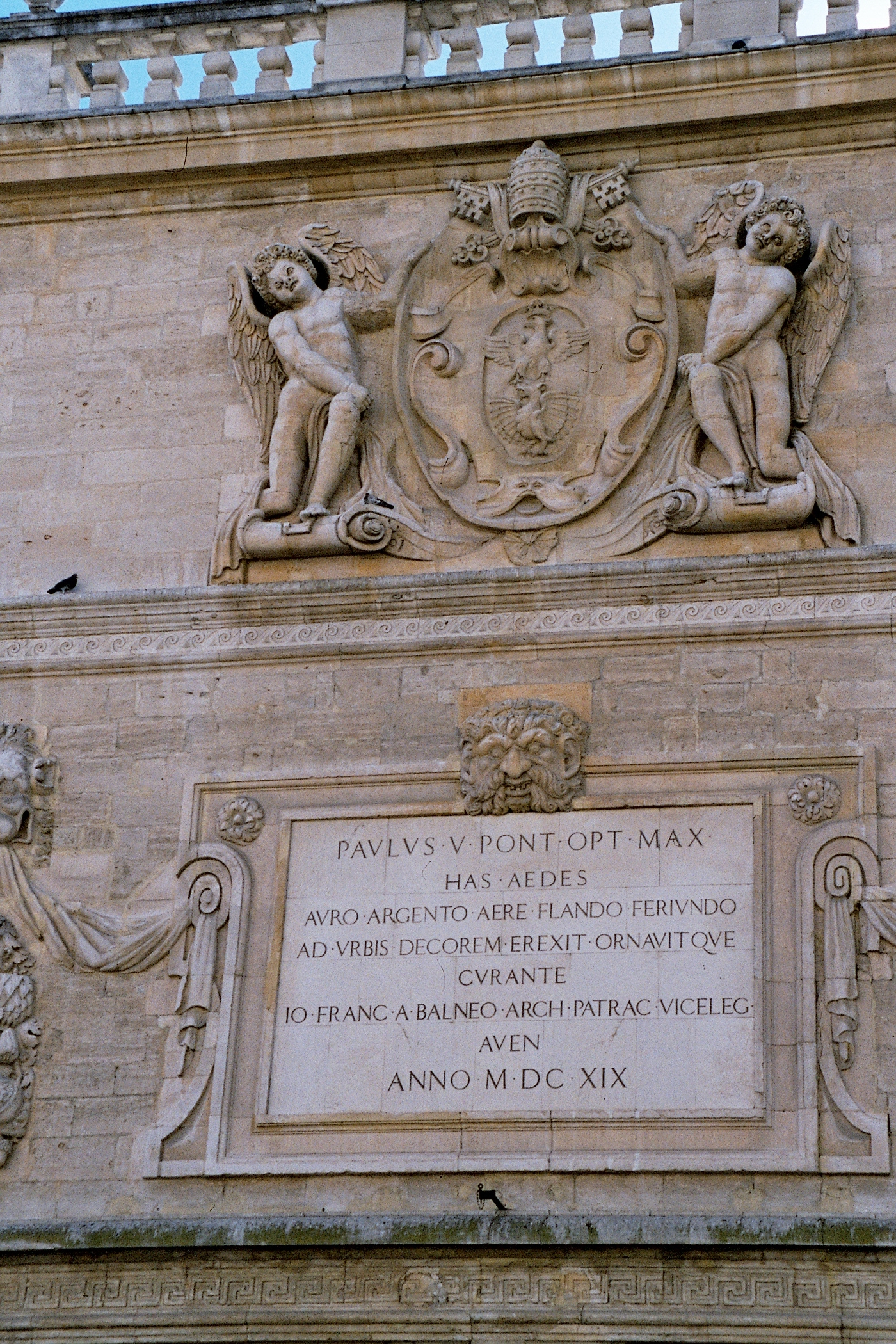
Paul V's coat-of-arms on a building located opposite the Papal Palace.

== Early modern period ==
After the return of the Papacy to Rome, the spiritual and temporal government of Avignon was entrusted to a Legate, usually the Cardinal-nephew. In the Legate's absence, a Vice-Legate (usually a commoner, not a cardinal) governed there. On 7 February 1693, Pope Innocent XII abolished the position of Cardinal-nephew and the office of Legate in Avignon; in 1692 he had made over its temporal government to the Congregation of Avignon. This was a department of the Curia in Rome), with the Cardinal Secretary of State as presiding prefect, exercising its jurisdiction through the Vice-Legate. It was linked to the Congregation of Loreto within the Curia. Decisions of the Vice-Legate were appealed to the Congregation. In 1774, the Vice-Legate was made president, thus depriving him of almost all authority. The office was done away with under Pope Pius VI on 12 June 1790.

The Public Council was composed of 48 councillors chosen by the people, four members of the clergy, and four doctors from the university, and met under the presidency of the chief magistrate of the city. This was the viquier (Occitan), the annually nominated representative of the Legate or Vice-Legate. The councillors' duty was to watch over the material and financial interests of the city. Their resolutions had to be approved by the Vice-Legate. Three consuls, chosen annually by the Council, had charge of the administration of the streets.

Avignon's survival as a papal enclave was, however, somewhat precarious, as the French crown maintained a large standing garrison at Villeneuve-lès-Avignon just across the river.

On the death of Philippe de Lévis, Archbishop of Arles, in 1475, Pope Sixtus IV divided the Archdiocese of Arles. He created the Archdiocese of Avignon, including Avignon and the Dioceses of Carpentras, Cavaillon, and Vaison. Sixtus appointed as Archbishop his Cardinal-nephew Giuliano della Rovere (the future Pope Julius II).

From the fifteenth century onward, the kings of France sought to control Avignon. In 1472, royal favorite Charles de Bourbon, Archbishop of Lyon became Legate, but in 1474 Pope Sixtus appointed della Rovere in his place.

This offended Louis XI of France, who sent troops to occupy the city in 1476. However, after meeting with della Rovere, Louis agreed to his appointment.

About this time, Avignon was ravaged by a major flood of the Rhone. King Louis XI issued letters patent for repair of a bridge in Avignon in 1479.

In 1536, during the Italian War of 1536–1538, king Francis I of France occupied the papal territory, to deny it to the forces of Emperor Charles V. When he entered the city the people received him very well, and in return for the reception the people were all granted to them the same privileges that French subjects enjoyed, such as being able to hold state offices. However, at the end of the war in 1538, French forces withdrew.

In 1562, the city was besieged by Huguenots led by François de Beaumont, baron des Adrets.

Charles IX passed through the city during his royal tour of France (1564-1566) together with his court and prominent nobles, including his brother Henri, Duke of Anjou, Henry of Navarre, Cardinal de Bourbon, and Cardinal de Lorraine. The court stayed for three weeks.

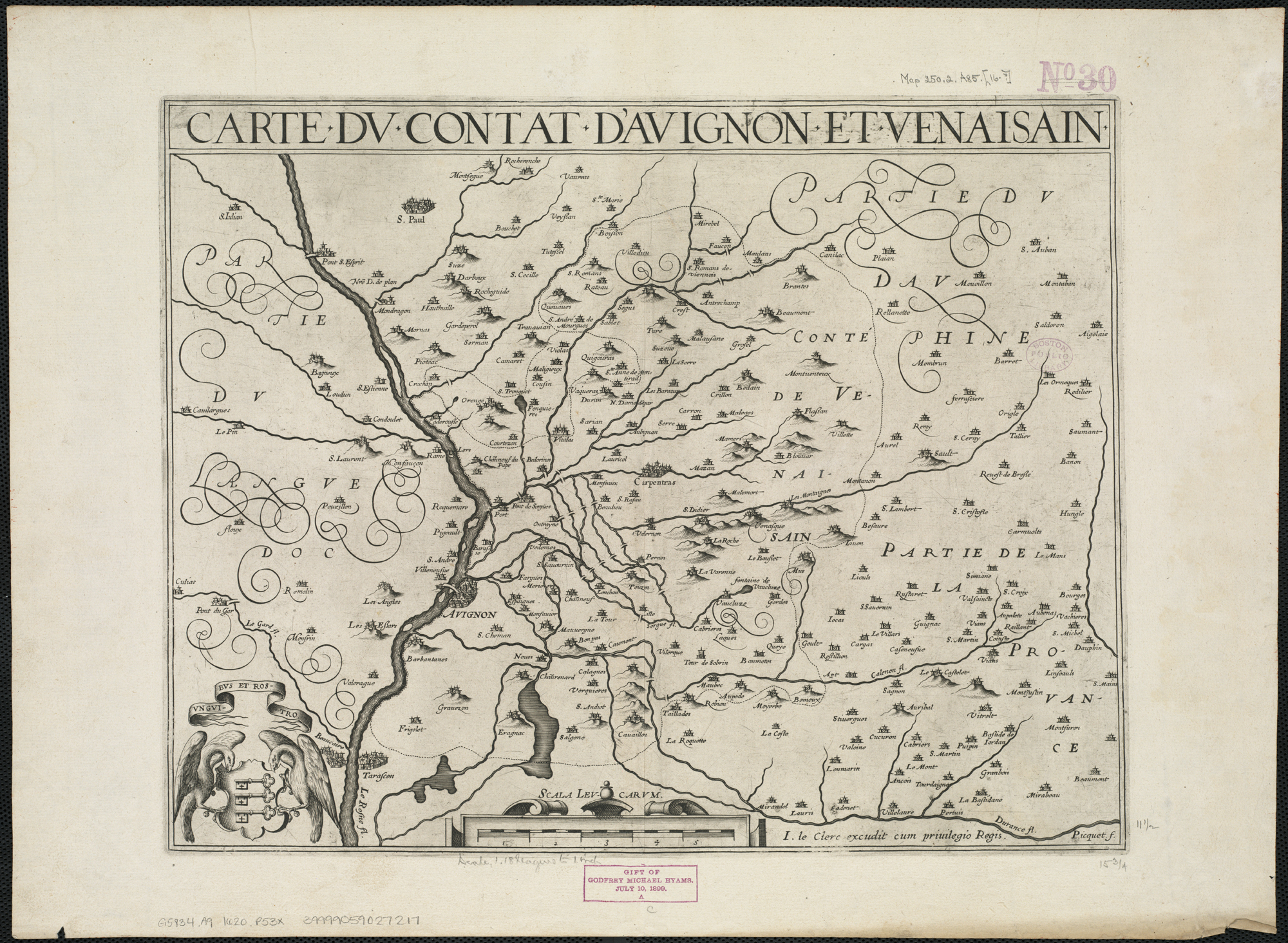
Map of Avignon and of Comtat Venaissin, drawn by Jean Picquet and engraved by Jean Leclerc

In 1583 King Henry III offered exchange the Marquisate of Saluzzo for Avignon, but this offer was refused by Pope Gregory XIII. In 1618 Cardinal Richelieu was exiled in Avignon. The city was visited by Vincent de Paul in 1607 and also by Francis de Sales in 1622.

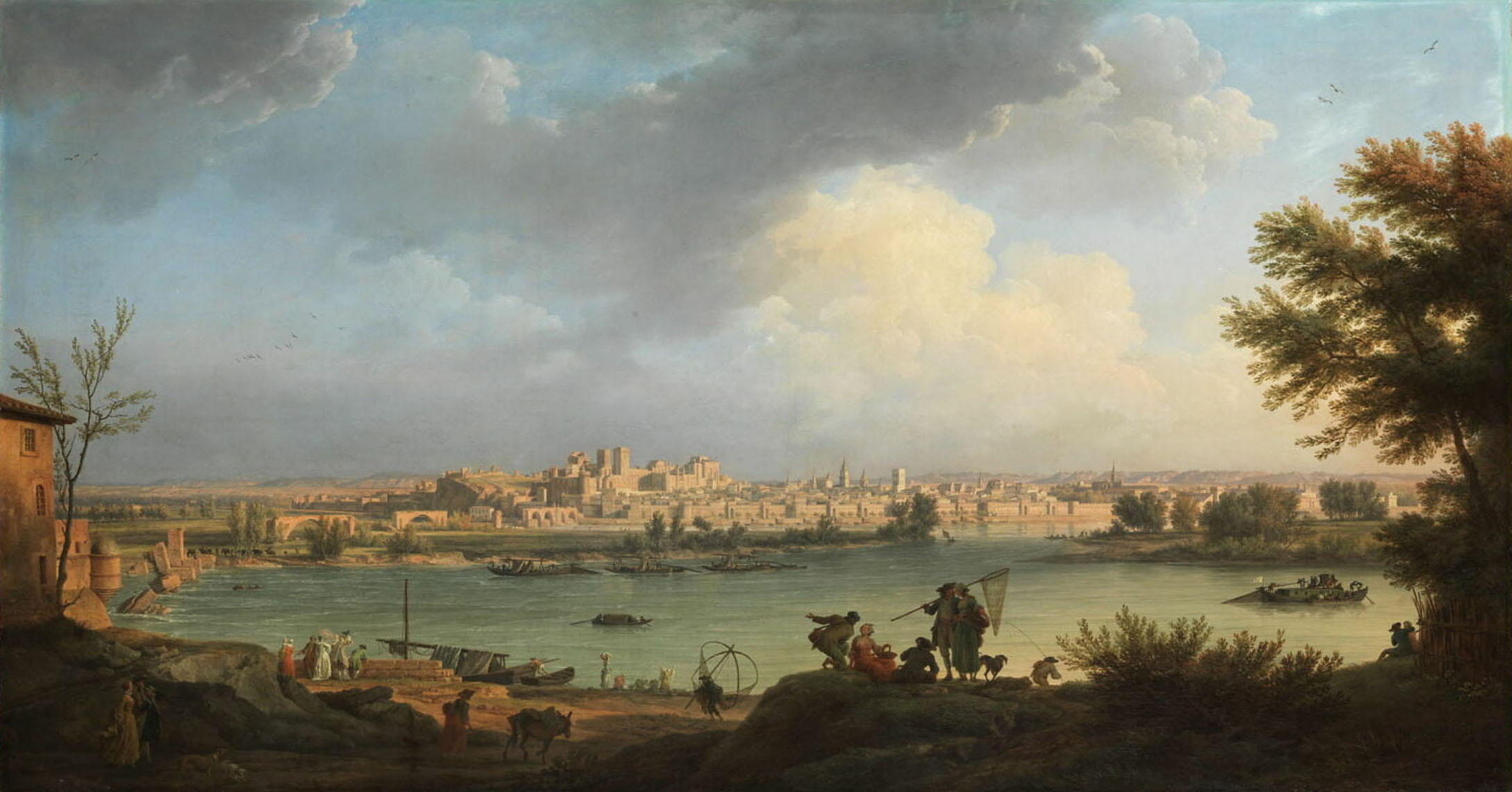
View of Avignon from the Right Bank of the Rhone by Claude-Joseph Vernet, 1757

By the mid-17th century, Avignon was considered a de facto part of the Kingdom of France by the provincial parlement of Provence. In 1663, Louis XIV seized Avignon and the Comtat Venaissin in retaliation for the Corsican Guard Affair, an attack on the Duc de Créqui, his ambassador to the Holy See. Louis returned the Comtat in 1664 after the Pope apologised for the attack. Louis annexed it a second time in 1688, from Pope Innocent XI, and returned it to Pope Alexander VIII by letters patent on 20 November 1689.

Avignon was free from conflict until Louis XV next occupied the Comtat from 1768 to 1774 and Avignon itself from 1768 to 1769, substituting French institutions for those in force with the approval of the people of Avignon and leading to the rise of a pro-French faction.

At the beginning of the 18th century, the streets of Avignon were narrow and winding, but buildings changed and houses gradually replaced the old buildings. Around the city there were mulberry plantations, orchards, and grasslands. On 2 January 1733 François Morénas founded a newspaper, the Courrier d'Avignon, whose name changed over time and through prohibitions. As it was published in the papal enclave, the newspaper was exempt from the French press control laws, while remaining subject to the papal authorities. The Courrier d'Avignon appeared from 1733 to 1793 with two interruptions: one between July 1768 and August 1769 due to France's annexation of Avignon and the other between 30 November 1790 and 24 May 1791.

== From the French Revolution to the end of the 19th century ==
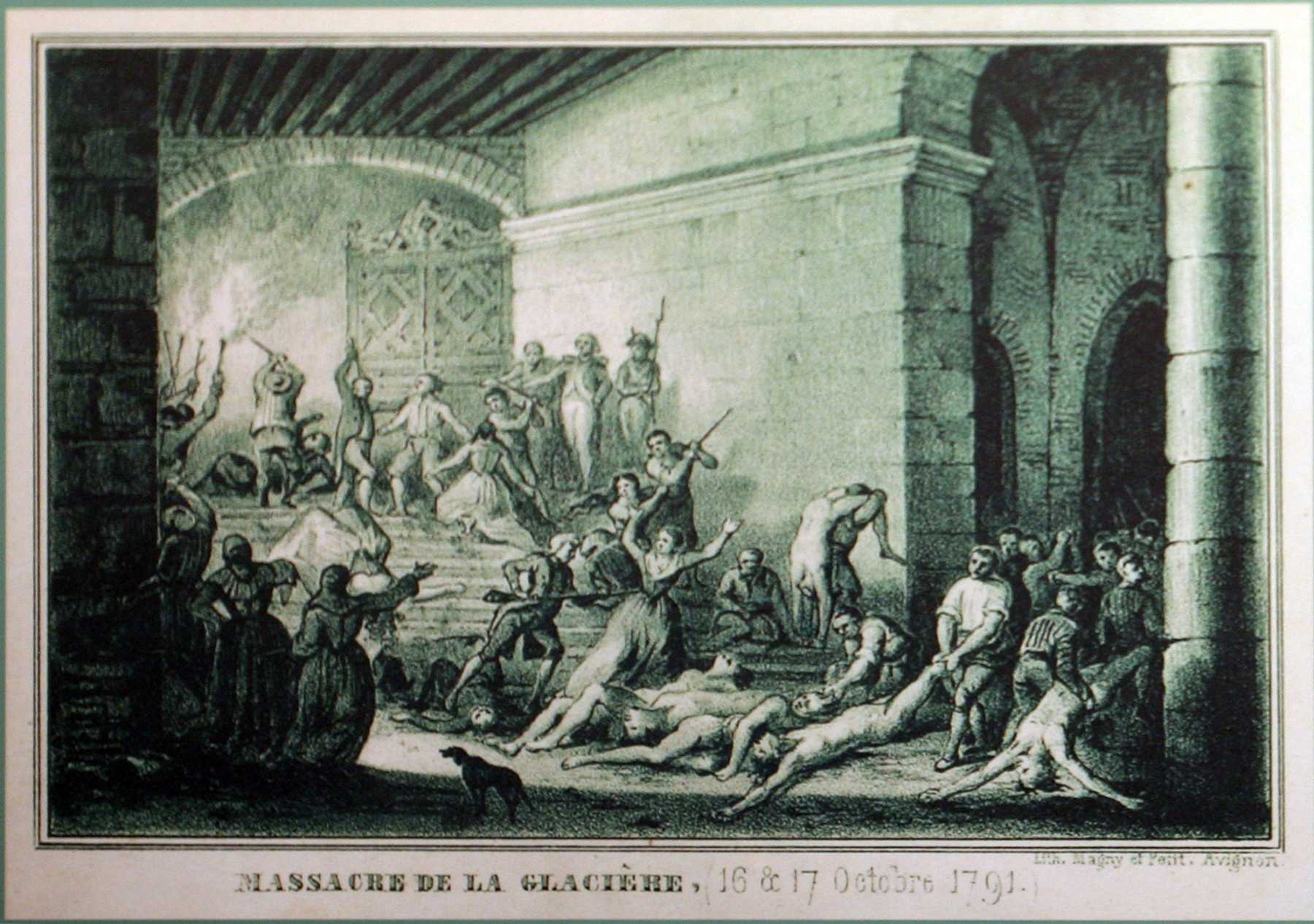
The Massacre of la Glacière in the interior of the Palace (1844).

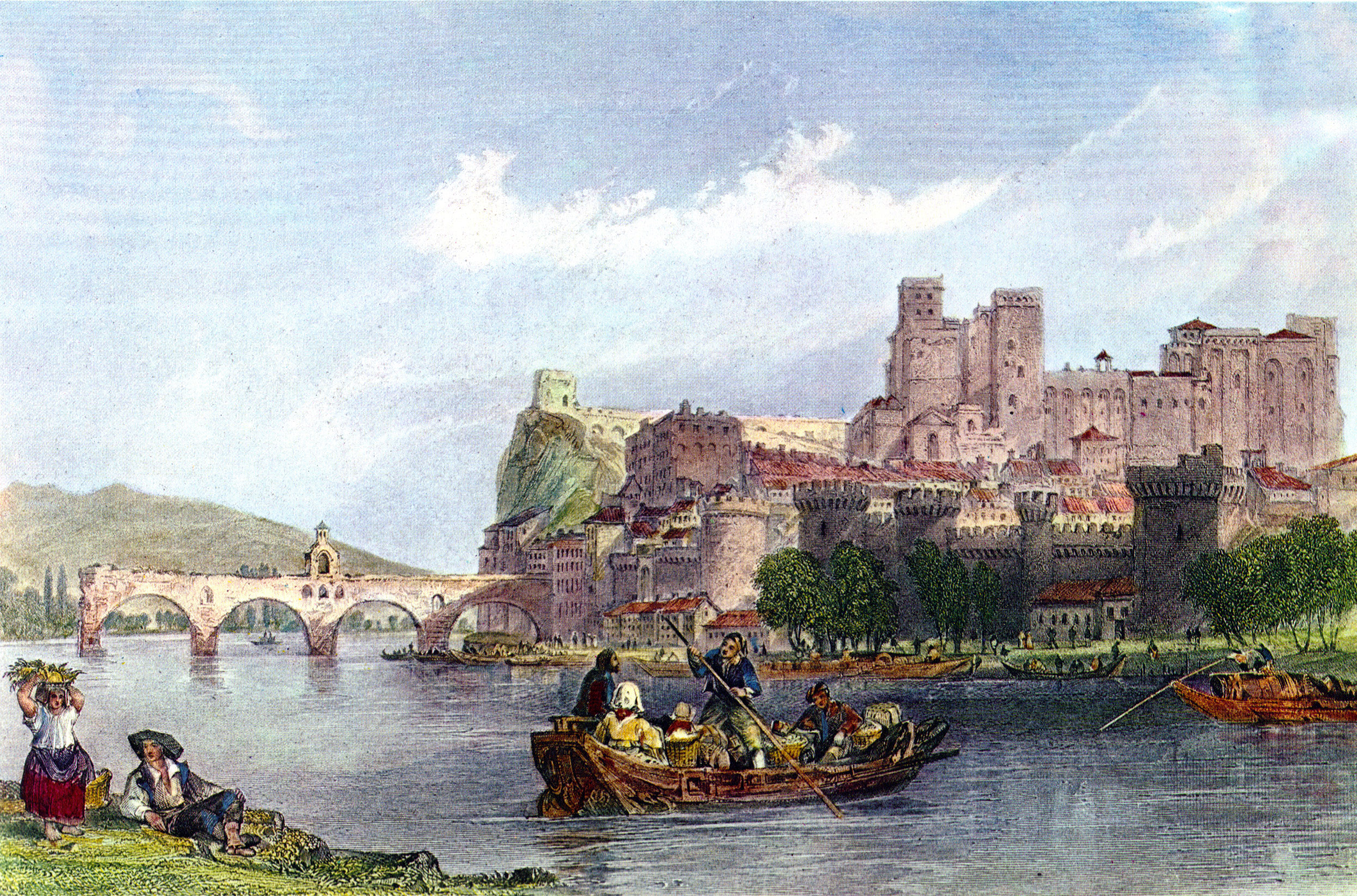
Boats at Avignon (drawing by T. Allom, engraved by E. Brandard).

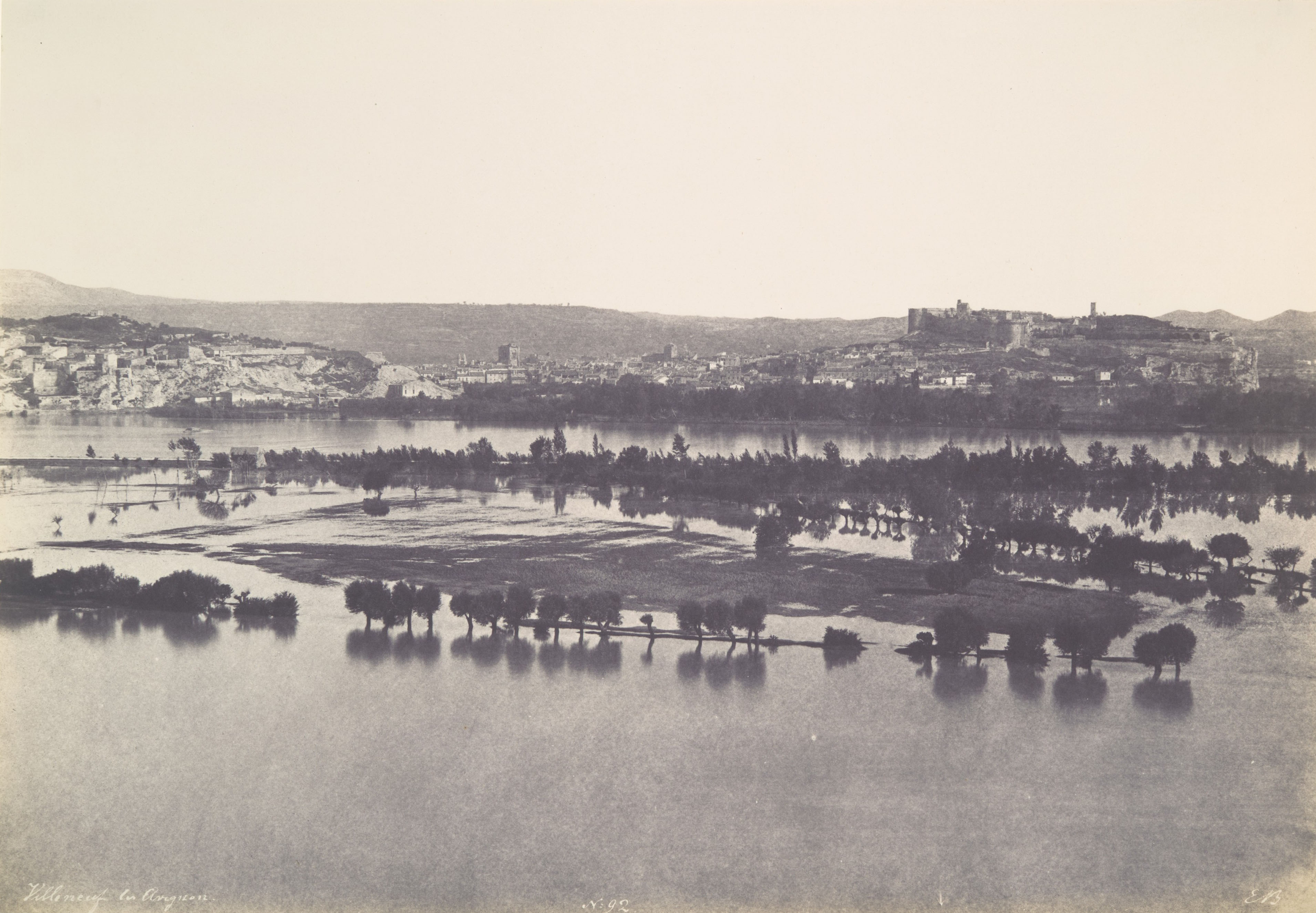
The floods at Avignon in 1856; photo Édouard Baldus

On 12 and 13 September 1791 the National Constituent Assembly voted for the annexation of Avignon and the reunion of Comtat Venaissin with the kingdom of France following a referendum submitted to the inhabitants of the Comtat.

On the night of 16 to 17 October 1791, after the lynching by a mob of the secretary-clerk of the commune who was wrongly suspected of wanting to seize church property, the event called the Massacres of La Glacière took place, when 60 people were summarily executed and thrown into the dungeon of the tower on the Palais des Papes.

On 7 July 1793 federalist insurgents under General Rousselet entered Avignon. During their passage along the Durance to retake the city by troops from Marseilles one person was killed: Joseph Agricol Viala. On 25 July General Carteaux appeared before the city and it was abandoned the next day by the troops of General Rousselet as a result of a misinterpretation of orders from Marseille.

On 25 June 1793 Avignon and Comtat-Venaissin were integrated along with the former principality of Orange to form the present department of Vaucluse with Avignon as its capital. This was confirmed on 19 February 1797 by the Treaty of Tolentino in which Article 5 definitively sanctioned the annexation stating that:

"The Pope renounces, purely and simply, all the rights to which he might lay claim over the city and territory of Avignon, and the Comtat Venaissin and its dependencies, and transfers and makes over the said rights to the French Republic."

On 1 October 1795 Alexandre Mottard de Lestang, a Knight, captured the town for the royalists with a troop of 10,000 men. The mission representative Boursault retook the city and had Lestang shot.

Before the French Revolution Avignon had as suffragan sees Carpentras, Vaison and Cavaillon, which were united by the Napoleonic Concordat of 1801 to Avignon, together with the Diocese of Apt, a suffragan of Aix-en-Provence. However, at that same time Avignon was reduced to the rank of a bishopric and was made a suffragan see of Aix.

On 30 May 1814 the French annexation of Avignon was recognized by the Pope. Ercole Consalvi made an ineffectual protest at the Congress of Vienna in 1815 but Avignon was never restored to the Holy See. In 1815, Bonapartist Marshal Guillaume Marie Anne Brune was assassinated by adherents of the royalist party during the White Terror. The murder took place in the former Hotel du Palais Royal that was located Place Crillon in front of today's Hotel d'Europe.

In the years 1820-1830 Villeneuve was forced to yield part of its territory to Avignon: the part called the Île de la Barthelasse.

The Archdiocese of Avignon was re-established in 1822, receiving as suffragan sees the Diocese of Viviers, Valence: (formerly under Lyon), Nîmes, and Montpellier (formerly under Toulouse).

On 18 October 1847 the Avignon - Marseille railway line was opened by the Compagnie du chemin de fer de Marseille à Avignon (Marseille to Avignon Railway Company). In 1860 the current Avignon Centre railway station was built. In November 1898 the tramway network of the Compagnie des Tramways Électriques d'Avignon (Electric Tramways Company of Avignon) was opened to replace the old company of horse-drawn transport.

During the coup of 2 December 1851 the people of Avignon, with Alphonse Gent, tried to oppose it.

In 1856 a major flood on the Durance river flooded Avignon.

== From the beginning of the 20th century to today ==
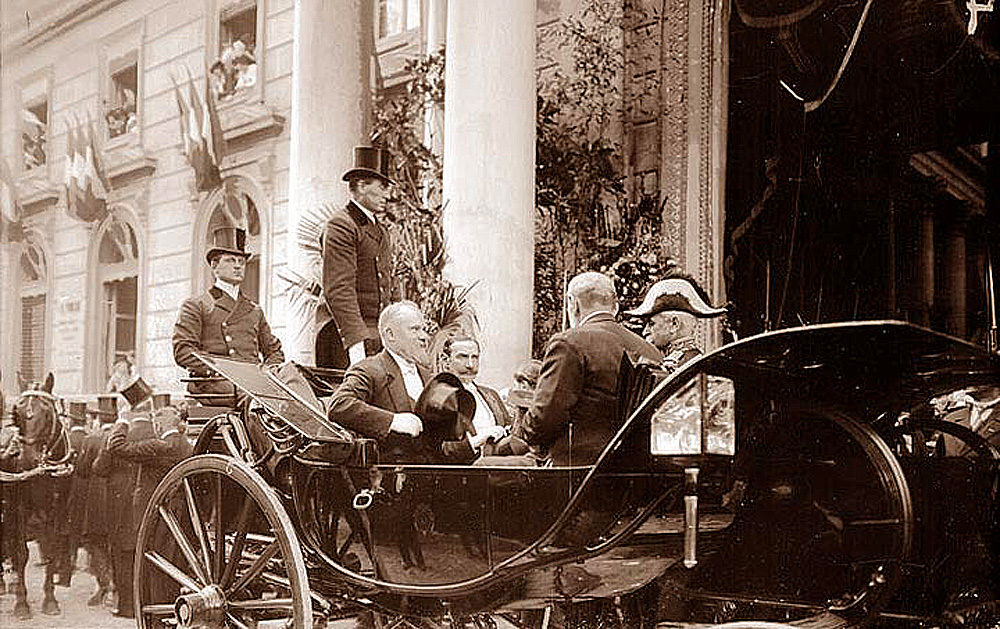
Arrival at Avignon of Raymond Poincaré, President of the Republic, on 14 October 1913.

The newly elected President of the Republic at the beginning of the year 1913, Raymond Poincaré, visited Provence in mid-October. He wrote in his book In the Service of France: Europe under arms: 1913, a description of his successive visits. The primary purpose of the visit was to verify in situ the state of mind of the Félibrige in the likely event of a conflict with Germany. He met, at Maillane and at Sérignan-du-Comtat, the two most illustrious people Frédéric Mistral and Jean-Henri Fabre. Between these two appointments he paused at Avignon where he was received triumphantly at the Hôtel de Ville.

Already the reception Poincaré had received at the Mas du Juge from the poet and the communal meal they had taken in the presidential train at Graveson had reassured him of the patriotism of Provence. It was, therefore in these terms that he spoke on the Nobel Prize in Literature:

"Dear and illustrious master, you who have pointed out imperishable monuments in honour of French land; you who have raised the prestige of a language and a literature that has a place in our national history to be proud of; you who, in glorifying Provence, have braided a crown of olive green; to you, august master, I bring the testimony of the recognition of the Republic and the great motherland".

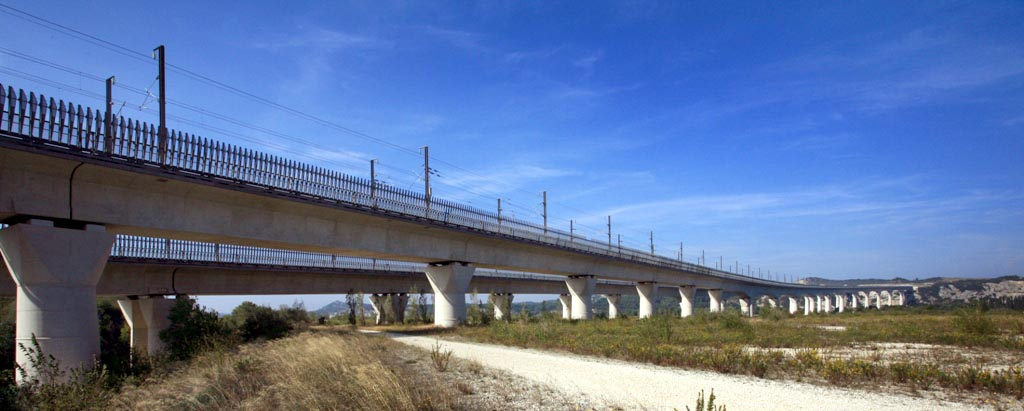
The TGV double viaduct at Angles, bridge on the LGV Méditerranée over the Rhône.

The 20th century saw significant development of urbanization, mainly outside the city walls, and several major projects have emerged. Between 1920 and 1975 the population has almost doubled despite the cession of Le Pontet in 1925 and the Second World War.

On the transport side 1937 saw the creation of the Avignon - Caumont Airport which became an international airport in the early 1980s with the opening of international routes, a new control tower, extension of the runway, etc.

In September 1947 the first edition of the future Avignon Festival was held.

After the Second World War on 11 November 1948 Avignon received a citation of the order of the division. This distinction involved the awarding of the Croix de Guerre with Silver Star. The city rose, expanded its festival, dusted off its monuments, and developed its tourism and trade.

In 1977 the city was awarded the Europe Prize, awarded by the Council of Europe.

In 1996 the LGV Méditerranée railway project was started. Its path passes through the commune and over the Rhone. From 1998 to 2001 the Avignon TGV station was built.

In 2002, as part of the reshuffling of the ecclesiastic provinces of France, the Archdiocese of Avignon ceased to be a metropolitan and became, instead a suffragan diocese of the new province of Marseilles, while keeping its rank of archdiocese.

On 8 July 2008 waste containing unenriched uranium leaked into two rivers from Tricastin nuclear plant in southern France. Some 30,000 litres (7,925 gallons) of solution containing 12g of uranium per litre spilled from an overflowing reservoir at the facility – which handles liquids contaminated by uranium – into the ground and into the Gaffiere and Lauzon rivers. The authorities kept this a secret from the public for 12 hours then issued a statement prohibiting swimming and fishing in the Gaffiere and Lauzon rivers.

A shooting occurred on July 2, 2017, near the Arrahma mosque in Avignon, Provence-Alpes-Côte d'Azur, France. Eight people were injured during shooting. Two hooded gunmen arrived in a Renault Clio at the Arrahma mosque in Avignon at 22:30 CEST as worshippers were leaving the mosque. The gunmen opened fire with one carrying a shotgun and another a pistol. The gunmen were able to injure four people at the scene while a family of four in a nearby apartment received shrapnel wounds. A seven-year-old girl were among those injured. The authorities ruled out the possibility the attack was hate-related or a terrorist attack. An eyewitness claimed a 40 year old worshipper was targeted.

In 2024, Avignon would serve as the location of the Pelicot rape trial which attracted international attention.

== See also ==
- Timeline of Avignon
- Walls of Avignon

== Sources ==
- Baratier, Edouard, ed. (1969). Histoire de la Provence (in French). Toulouse, France: Privat.
- Carru, Dominique (1999). "Le Rhône à Avignon. Données archéologiques". Gallia (in French). 56: 109–120. doi:10.3406/galia.1999.3248.
- Ceccarelli, Albert (1989). La Révolution à L'Isle sur la Sorgue et en Vaucluse (in French). L'Isle sur la Sorgue, France: Editions Scriba. ISBN 978-286736018-3.
- Champion, Maurice (1861). Les inondations en France depuis le VIe siècle jusqu'a nos jours (in French). Vol. 3. Paris: V. Dalmont.
- Champion, Maurice (1862). Les inondations en France depuis le VIe siècle jusqu'a nos jours (in French). Vol. 4. Paris: V. Dalmont.
- Fantin-Desodoards, Antoine Étienne (1807). Histoire philosophique de la révolution de France, depuis la première Assemblée des notables jusqu'a la paix de Presbourg. Volume 2 (in French) (5th ed.). Paris: Impr. des freres Mame.
- Favier, Jean (2006). Les papes d'Avignon (in French). Paris: Fayard. ISBN 978-2-21362524-9.
- Février, Paul-Albert, ed. (1989). La Provence des origines à l'an mil: histoire et archéologie (in French). Rennes: Ouest-France. ISBN 978-273730456-9.
- Gagnière, Sylvain; Granier, J. (1976). Catalogue raisonné des stèles anthropomorphes chalcolithiques du Musée Calvet d'Avignon (in French). Avignon: Musée Calvet. OCLC 263670399.
- Girard, Joseph (1958). Évocation du Vieil Avignon (in French). Paris: Les Éditions de Minuit. OCLC 5391399.
- Guillemain, Bernard (1998). Les Papes d'Avignon: 1309-1376 (in French). Paris: Cerf. ISBN 978-220405895-7.
- Miquel, Pierre (1980). Les guerres de religion (in French). Paris: Fayard. ISBN 9782213008264.
- Renouard, Yves (2004) [1954]. La Papauté à Avignon (in French). Paris: J.-P. Gisserot. ISBN 978-2-87747-748-2.
- Stephens, Henry Morse (1897). Revolutionary Europe, 1789–1815 (4th ed.). London: Rivingtons.
- Herbermann, Charles, ed. (1913). "Avignon" . Catholic Encyclopedia. New York: Robert Appleton Company.
- Herbermann, Charles, ed. (1913). "Councils of Avignon" . Catholic Encyclopedia. New York: Robert Appleton Company.
- Herbermann, Charles, ed. (1913). "University of Avignon" . Catholic Encyclopedia. New York: Robert Appleton Company.
- Chisholm, Hugh, ed. (1911). "Avignon" . Encyclopædia Britannica (11th ed.). Cambridge University Press.
