= Timeline of Avignon =

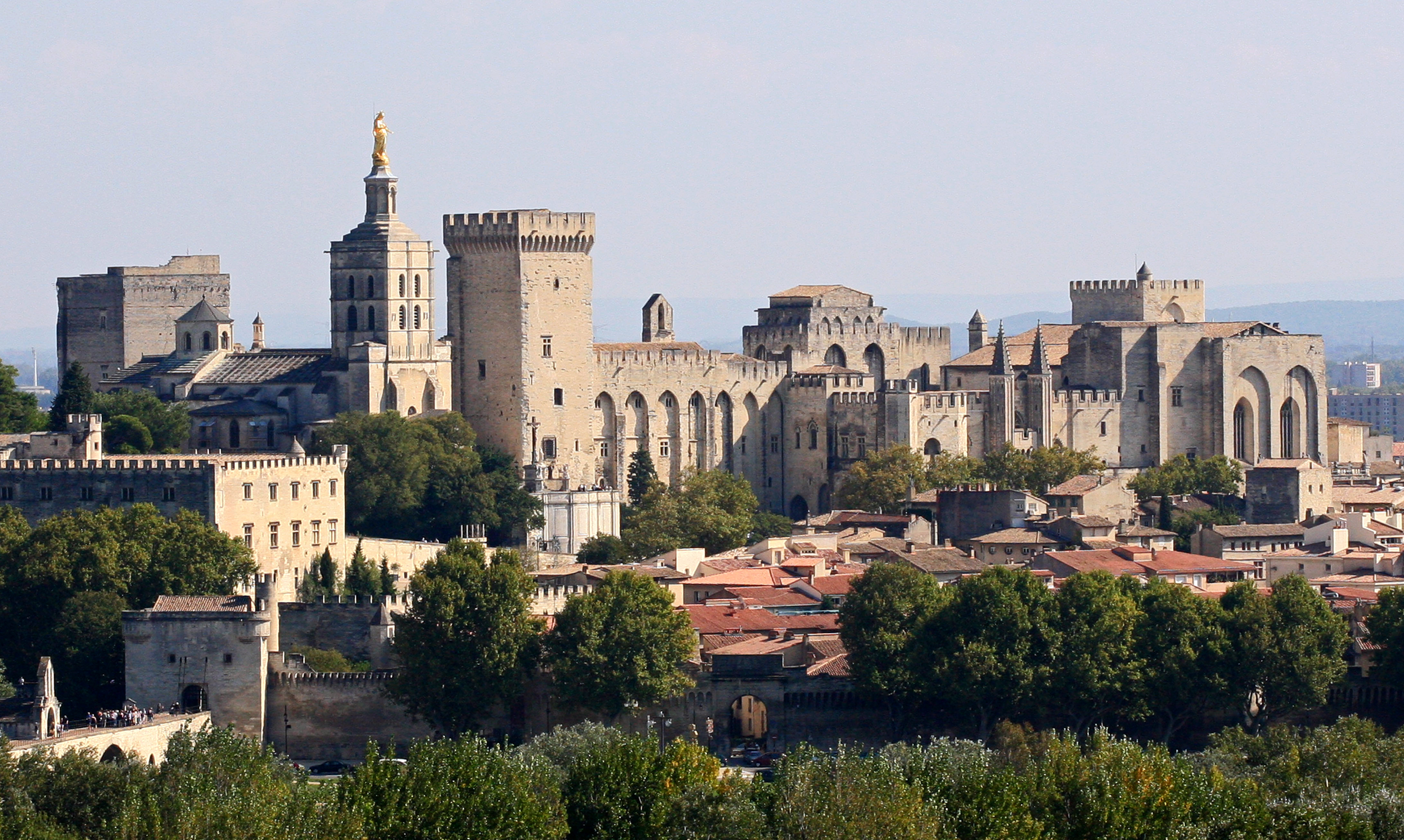
The historic centre with the Palais des Papes

The following is a timeline of the history of the city of Avignon in southern France.

== Prior to 14th century ==
- 4th–5th century AD – Diocese of Avignon established.
- 500 – Frankish regulus, Clovis I besieges the city during the Franco-Visigothic Wars, but is convinced to abandon the siege.
- 508 – Wandill, a lieutenant of Theoderic the Great, king of the Ostrogoths, makes Avignon his headquarters.
- 581 – Mummolus in Avignon resisted siege by the Austrasian Guntram Boso.
- 591 – Outbreak of plague.
- 599 – Outbreak of plague.
- 730 – Saracens in power.
- 737 – Town falls to the Frankish leader Charles Martel after a siege.
- 739 – Saracens retake town.
- 1054 – Great Schism breaks apart the Roman Catholic Church and Eastern Orthodox Church, of which the Diocese of Avignon belongs to the former and will play an important role for the Papacy in coming centuries.
- 1080 – Catholic Council of Avignon held.
- c. 1129 – Beginning of the Commune, a period when Avignon was self-governing. Provence was divided between three families: Ramon Berenguer III, Count of Barcelona, William III of Forcalquier and Alfonso Jordan (Count of Toulouse).
- 1185 – Pont Saint-Bénézet (bridge) completed (traditional date).
- c. 1220 – a second set of city walls constructed outside the earlier walls.
- 1226 – Town falls to Louis VIII of France after a three-month siege during the Albigensian Crusade.
- 1251 – Convention of Beaucaire and the end of the Commune, the two brothers of Louis IX, Alphonse of Poitiers and Charles I of Anjou, take control of the town.
- 1290 – Charles II of Anjou becomes the sole seigneur of the town.

== 14th century ==
- 1303 – University of Avignon founded.
- 1309 – Pope Clement V moves to Avignon at the start of the Avignon Papacy.
- 1334 – Papal conclave in Avignon elects Pope Benedict XII.
- 1335 – Construction of the Palais des Papes begins under Pope Benedict XII.
- 1348
  - Avignon bought by Pope Clement VI from Joanna, countess of Provence for 80,000 florins.
  - Black Death kills perhaps half the population of the town.
- 1355 – Avignon menaced by bands of mercenaries.
- c. 1357 – Construction of the city walls begins.
- 1367–1370 – Pope Urban V in Rome.
- 1376 – Pope Gregory XI leaves Avignon for Rome at the end of the Avignon Papacy.
- 1378 – Western Schism begins with Antipope Clement VII in Avignon and Pope Urban VI in Rome.

== 15th century ==
- 1408 – Antipope Benedict XIII escapes from Avignon.
- 1417 – Western Schism ends with the election in Rome of Pope Martin V.
- 1475 – Diocese of Avignon elevated to an archdiocese.
- 1479–1488 – City walls repaired and remodelled with the reduction in the number of gates from twelve to seven. The work was initiated by Archbishop Giuliano della Rovere who subsequently became Pope Julius II.
- 1481 – Avignon becomes an enclave when Provence becomes part of France with the death of Charles II, Count of Provence.

== 16th century ==
- 1517 – Italian scholars Sannazar de Ripa and André Alciat arrive to teach at the University of Avignon.
- 1561 – Pope Pius IV sends his cousin, Fabrizio Serbelloni, to organise the defence of the town against the Huguenots during the French Wars of Religion (1562–1598).
- 1564 – Jesuit college established in the town.
- 1580 – Outbreak of plague.

== 17th century ==
- 1662–1663 – Opening of three city gates that had been walled up during the Wars of Religion. The gates were: Porte de la Ligne, Porte de l'Oulle and the Porte Saint-Roch.
- 1662–1664 – Annexation of Avignon by Louis XIV of France.
- 1669 – Pont Saint-Bénézet abandoned.
- 1688–1689 – Annexation of Avignon by Louis XIV of France.

== 18th century ==
- 1753 – Work begins to remove a section of the Rocher des Doms to widen the towpath along the Rhône.
- 1755 – Severe flooding with more than three quarters of the town under water.
- 1768–1774 – Annexation of Avignon by Louis XV of France.
- 1791
  - 14 September – Avignon and the Comtat Venaissin declared part of France during the French Revolution.
  - Massacres of La Glacière
- 1792 – Avignon becomes part of the Bouches-du-Rhône souveraineté.
- 1794 – Montfavet becomes part of Avignon.
- 1796 – Archives départementales de Vaucluse established.
- 1797 – 19 February – Treaty of Tolentino in which Pope Pius VI formally cedes control of Avignon to France.

== 19th century ==
- 1800 – Population: 21,412.
- 1801
  - Canton of Avignon-Nord and Canton of Avignon-Sud created.
  - Lycée d'agriculture, des sciences et des arts founded.
- 1802 – Chamber of Commerce established.
- 1811 – Calvet Museum established.
- 1815 – Guillaume Brune assassinated.
- 1819 – Construction completed of a wooden bridge across the Rhône.
- 1822 – Cimetière Saint-Véran (cemetery) established.
- 1823 – Demolition of the 10th century Benedictine Convent of Saint-Laurent to make way for a new theatre and to enlarge the Place de l'Horlorge. The convent had been unoccupied since the revolution.
- 1825 – Théâtre Municipal opens on the Place de l'Horloge.
- 1828 – L'Écho de Vaucluse begins publication.
- 1840 – Severe flooding in the town.
- 1843 – Suspension bridge opens linking Avignon to the Île de la Barthelasse.
- 1844–1845 – Demolition of the 14th century cardinal's palace, la livrée d'Albano, except for the Jacquemart tower, to make way for the construction of a new Hôtel de Ville.
- 1847 – Théâtre Municipal/Opéra d'Avignon rebuilt.
- 1849
  - Railway line linking Avignon with Marseille opened.
  - Société d'agriculture founded.
- 1852 – Final demolition of the Dominican monastery north of the rue d'Annanelle (Le couvent des Dominicains or des Frères prêcheurs) with its large 14th century church. The monastery had been established in 1220 but had been converted into a foundry during the Revolution.
- 1854
  - Railway line linking Avignon with Paris opened.
  - Cholera epidemic strikes the town.
- 1856 – Severe flooding in the town and the collapse of a section of the city walls.
- 1856 – Hôtel de Ville completed.
- 1860 – Gare d'Avignon-Centre (train station) built.
- 1870 – Morières-lès-Avignon splits from Avignon to form its own commune.
- 1881 – Le Radical de Vaucluse newspaper begins publication.
- 1896 – Demolition of the 14th century city gate, La Porte Limbert.
- 1899
  - Electric tram begins operating.
  - École des Beaux-Arts d'Avignon and Société avignonnaise des concerts symphoniques founded.

== 20th century ==
- 1901 – Population: 43,453.
- 1909 – A stone bridge, the Nouveau Pont, replaces the wooden bridge across the Villeneuve branch of the Rhône.
- 1913 – AC Arles-Avignon (football club) formed.
- 1925 – Le Pontet is split from Avignon to form a separate commune.
- 1929 – Société d'étude des sciences naturelles de Vaucluse founded.
- 1935 – Serious flooding of the town by the Rhône.
- 1937 – Avignon-Caumont Aerodrome established.
- 1944
  - 27 May – Bombs dropped by American aircraft on the south of the town destroy railway lines, some industrial buildings and 600 houses. There are 500 dead and 800 injured.
  - 25 June – Bombs damage the railway viaduct across the Rhône, the suspension bridge, the goods yard of the station and the rue de la République.
- 1947 – Festival d'Avignon begins.
- 1973 – Canton of Avignon-Est and Canton of Avignon-Ouest created.
- 1975
  - Parc des Sports (Avignon) (stadium) opens.
  - Population: 90,786.
- 1979 – Transports en Commun de la Région d'Avignon (transit entity) in operation.
- 1982 – Avignon becomes part of the Provence-Alpes-Côte d'Azur region.
- 1984
  - Avignon Film Festival begins.
  - Université d'Avignon et des Pays de Vaucluse created.
- 1986 – Archives Municipales d’Avignon (city archives) established.
- 1997 – Main campus of the Université d’Avignon (Campus Hannah Arendt), established on the site of the former Hôpital Sainte-Marthe.

== 21st century ==
- 2001
  - Gare d'Avignon TGV (train station) opens.
  - Agglomeration community Grand Avignon (regional government) created.
- 2003 – Flooding of the Île de la Barthelasse and parts of the town by the Rhône.
- 2006 – Population: 90,800.
- 2009 – Vélopop' bikeshare begins.
- 2013 – Virgule d'Avignon (train) begins operating.
- 2014 – Cécile Helle becomes mayor.
- 2024 – Internationally acclaimed Mazan rapes trial is held in the city for Dominique Pelicot and 50 co-defendants, with all 51 defendants receiving convictions.

== See also ==
- Walls of Avignon
- History of Avignon
- List of bishops of Avignon

== Sources ==
- Aliquot, Hervé; et al. (1988). Avignon au Moyen Age : textes et documents. Archives du Sud (in French). Avignon: Aubanel. ISBN 978-2-7006-0132-9.
- Clap, Sylvestre; Huet, Oliver (2005). Les Remparts d'Avignon (in French). Avignon: Benezet. ISBN 2-9522-367-1-2.
- Gagnière, Sylvain; et al. (1979). Histoire d'Avignon (in French). Aix-en-Provence, France: Édisud. ISBN 2-85744-056-1.
- Girard, Joseph (1958). Évocation du Vieil Avignon (in French). Paris: Les Éditions de Minuit. OCLC 5391399.
- Overall, William Henry, ed. (1870). "Avignon". Dictionary of Chronology. London: William Tegg. hdl:2027/uc2.ark:/13960/t9m32q949.
- Pardé, Maurice (1936). "La grande crue du Rhône en novembre 1935". Revue de géographie alpine (in French). 24 (24–2): 395–420. doi:10.3406/rga.1936.3535.
- Vincent, Benjamin (1910). "Avignon". Haydn's Dictionary of Dates. London: Ward and Lock. p. 112.
