= Domenico de' Marini =

Domenico de' Marini may refer to:

- Domenico de' Marini (patriarch) (died 1635), Roman Catholic patriarch
- Domenico de' Marini (1599-1669), Roman Catholic bishop
- Domenico de' Marini (died 1676), Roman Catholic bishop
