= Raymond Bouchex =

His Excellency Raymond Bouchex
- Archbishop of Avignon
- Church: Roman Catholic Church
- Archdiocese: Avignon
- See: Archdiocese of Avignon
- Predecessor: Eugène-Jean-Marie Polge
- Successor: Jean-Pierre Marie Cattenoz

Orders
- Ordination: 3 June 1950
- Consecration: 19 March 1972 by Jean-Baptiste-Étienne Sauvage

Personal details
- Born: 25 January 1927 Lugrin, France
- Died: 9 May 2010 (aged 83) Avignon, France

Raymond Joseph Louis Bouchex (25 January 1927, Lugrin – 9 May 2010) was the Roman Catholic archbishop of the Roman Catholic Archdiocese of Avignon, France.

Ordained to the priesthood on 3 June 1950, Bouchex was appointed auxiliary bishop of the Roman Catholic Archdiocese of Aix on 23 February 1972 and was ordained bishop on 19 March 1972. On 25 April 1978 Bouchex was appointed archbishop of the Avignon Archdiocese retiring on 21 June 2002.
