= Magnus of Avignon =

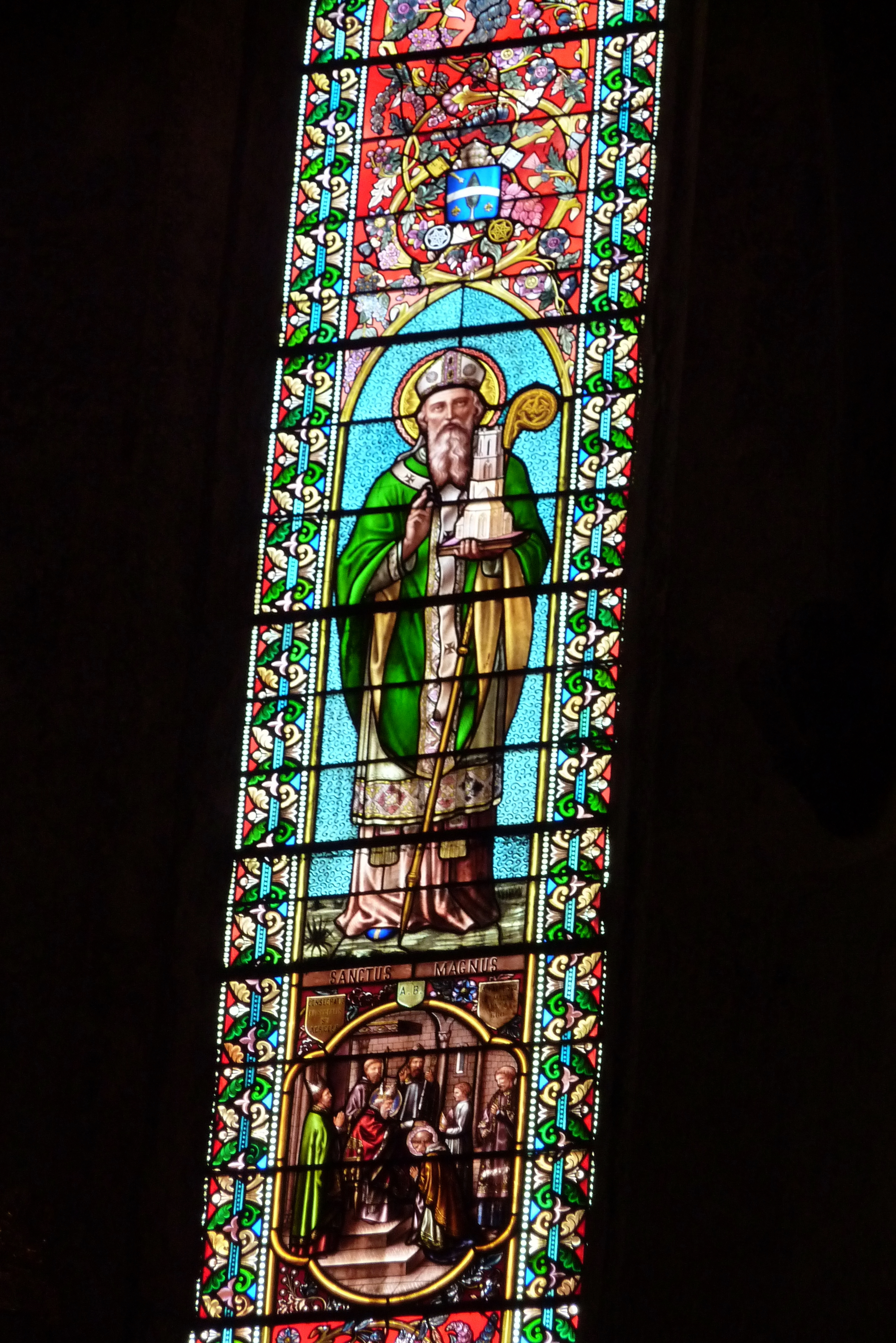
Stained glass window in the church of Saint-Agricol in Avignon, depicting Magnus of Avignon.

Saint Magnus of Avignon (French: Saint Magne) (died 660) was a bishop and governor of Avignon, his native city. He was a Gallo-Roman senator. A widower, he was the father of Saint Agricola of Avignon. Magnus became a monk and then became bishop of Avignon. He appointed his son coadjutor. He is the patron saint of fish dealers and fishmongers. His feast day is August 19.
