= Veredemus =

Saint Veredemus

Bishop
- Born: 640 prob. Greece
- Died: 720 AD; Gaul
- Venerated in: Roman Catholic Church; Eastern Orthodox Church
- Feast: June 17; August 20
- Patronage: invoked for rain; patron of shepherds at Crau, France

Saint Veredemus (also Veredemius; French: Saint Vérédème, Vrème, Vrime) was an 8th-century hermit who become bishop of Avignon around 700 AD. According to tradition, he was of Greek origin and was born around 640 AD.

Veredemus settled at Gaul as a hermit, in the valley of the Durance. A grotto associated with Veredemus is located at the Gorge du Gardon. He was a companion of Saint Giles and at the death of Saint Agricola of Avignon was chosen as bishop of Avignon. He served as bishop until around 720 AD.

== Veneration ==
Veredemus' hermitage at the gorges of Gardon is the oldest Christian structure in lower Languedoc, dating from 8th century AD. Its apse is decorated with 8th-century paintings.

Veredemus is venerated at Cavaillon, Apt, and Carpentras, and a fête Saint-Vérédème is celebrated at Eyguières. Until the 1960s, the inhabitants of Sanilhac would make the pilgrimage to Veredemus’ grotto on the Gardon to pray for abundant rain. He was the patron saint of the shepherds of the plains of Crau.
