= César Argelli =

17th-century Roman Catholic bishop

Most Reverend César Argelli
- Archbishop of Avignon
- Church: Catholic Church
- Archdiocese: Archdiocese of Avignon
- In office: 1647–1648
- Predecessor: Bernard Pinelli
- Successor: Didier Dominique Marini

Orders
- Consecration: 12 May 1647 by Federico Sforza

Personal details
- Born: 1574 Bologna, Italy
- Died: 30 Jul 1648 (age 74)

César Argelli (1574–1648) was a Roman Catholic prelate who served as Archbishop of Avignon (1647–1648).

== Biography ==
César Argelli was born in 1574 in Bologna, Italy. On 6 May 1647, he was appointed during the papacy of Pope Innocent X as Archbishop of Avignon. On 12 May 1647, he was consecrated bishop by Federico Sforza, Cardinal-Deacon of Santi Vito, Modesto e Crescenzia, with Ranuccio Scotti Douglas, Bishop of Borgo San Donnino, and Alessandro Vittrici, Bishop of Alatri, serving as co-consecrators. He served as Archbishop of Avignon until his death on 30 Jul 1648.

While bishop, he was the principal co-consecrator of Hyacinthe Serroni, Bishop of Orange (1647).

== External links and additional sources ==
- Cheney, David M. "Archdiocese of Avignon". Catholic-Hierarchy.org. (for Chronology of Bishops) ^{[self-published]}
- Chow, Gabriel. "Archdiocese of Avignon". GCatholic.org. (for Chronology of Bishops) ^{[self-published]}

Catholic Church titles
Preceded by Bernard Pinelli	Archbishop of Avignon; 1647–1648	Succeeded by Didier Dominique Marini
