= Agricola of Avignon =

Bishop of Avignon

Saint Agricola of Avignon
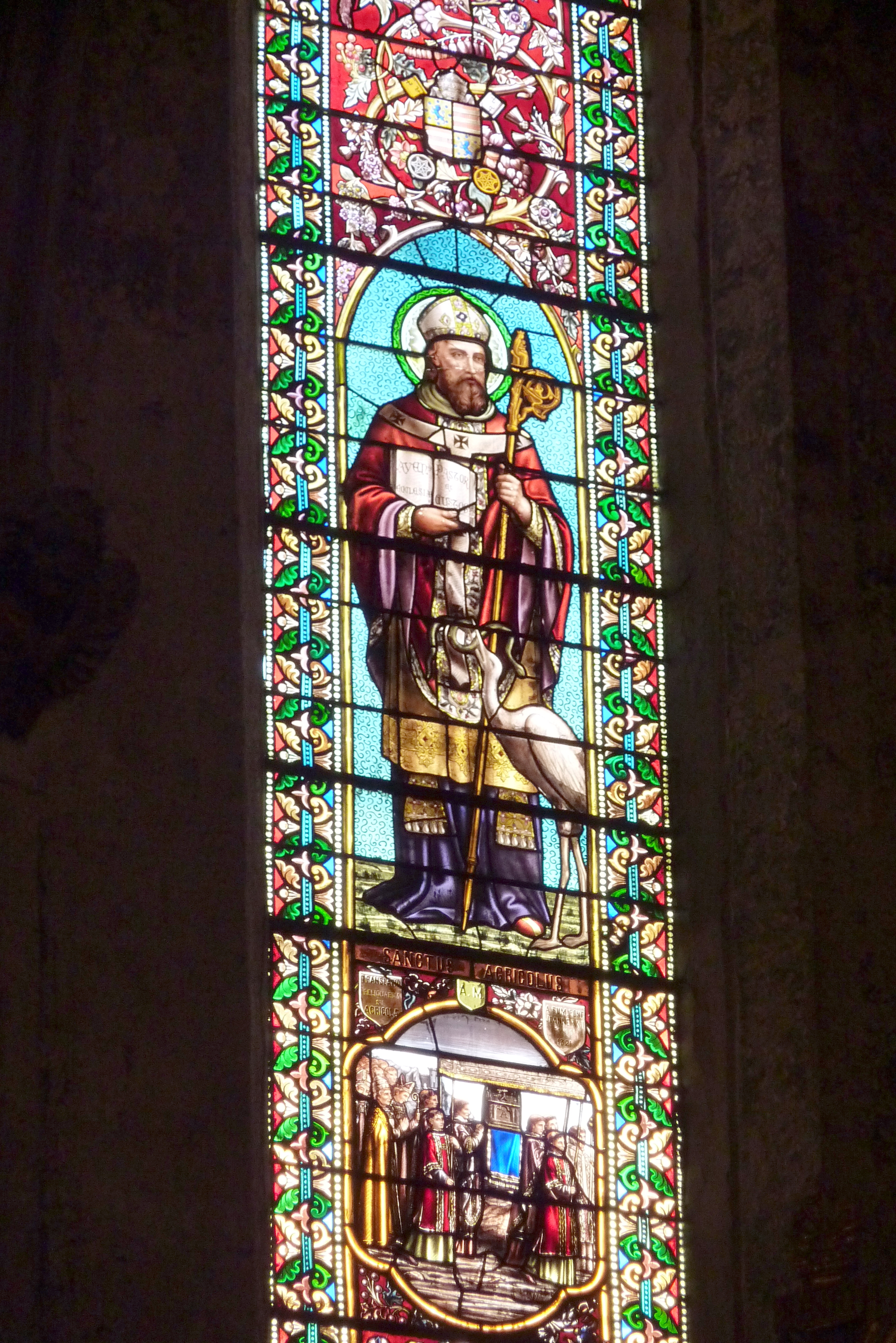
- Stained glass window in the church of Saint-Agricol in Avignon, depicting Agricola of Avignon
- Born: c. 630 AD
- Died: c. 700 AD
- Venerated in: Roman Catholic Church
- Major shrine: Church of Saint-Agricol (Saint Agricola), Avignon
- Feast: September 2
- Attributes: stork
- Patronage: Avignon, storks; invoked against the bubonic plague and misfortune of all kinds. Devotees prayed for his intercession for good weather, fine harvests, and rain.

Saint Agricola (Agricol, Agricolus) of Avignon (c. 630–c. 700) was a bishop of Avignon. According to tradition, Agricola ("farmer") was the son of Saint Magnus, also a bishop of the city.

== Life ==
At the age of sixteen, he was professed a monk at the Abbey of Lérins. However, at the age of thirty, he was summoned by his father Magnus to Avignon, where he was appointed coadjutor. When his father died in 660, he succeeded as bishop. He built a church in the city that was staffed by the monks of Lérins. He built a convent for Benedictine nuns. He was a well-known preacher, and famous for his charity and defense of the poor and sick against civil authorities.

He died of natural causes and was succeeded by Saint Veredemus.

== Veneration ==
A charter of 919 mentions that Saint Agricola had been buried in the Avignon church dedicated to Saint Peter (Saint-Pierre). At the end of the 11th century, Bishop Arbert of Avignon made a donation that referred to the abbey of Saint-Agricol; the church of Saint-Agricol (Saint Agricola) that seems to have been built in the 12th century was made collegial in 1321 by Pope John XXII, one of the Avignon-based popes, who equipped it with a statute and income. It is possible that on this occasion that the transfer of the relics of St. Agricola from the church of Saint-Pierre to Saint-Agricol occurred. They are still preserved in this church.

The cult of Saint Agricola increased in the 14th and 15th centuries. 15th-century documents record that he prevented an invasion of storks by his blessing. He is thus patron of storks and is depicted with them as his emblem. In 1647, he was declared patron saint of the city of Avignon by Archbishop César Argelli. Devotees prayed to the saint whose name signifies "cultivator of fields" for good weather, fine harvests, and rain during times of drought. He is also invoked against the bubonic plague and misfortune of all kinds. His feast day is September 2.

== Sources ==
- Elizabeth Hallam (ed.), Saints: Who They Are and How They Help You (New York: Simon & Schuster, 1994), 100.
