= Domenico de' Marini (1599–1669) =

Dominican archbishop of Avignon

Domenico de' Marini (1599-1669) was a Roman Catholic bishop. He was archbishop of Avignon from 1649 to 1669.

Catholic Church titles
Preceded by César Argelli	Archbishop of Avignon; 1649–1669	Succeeded by Azzo Ariosto
