= Avignon–Provence Airport =

Avignon–Provence Airport Aéroport Avignon Provence
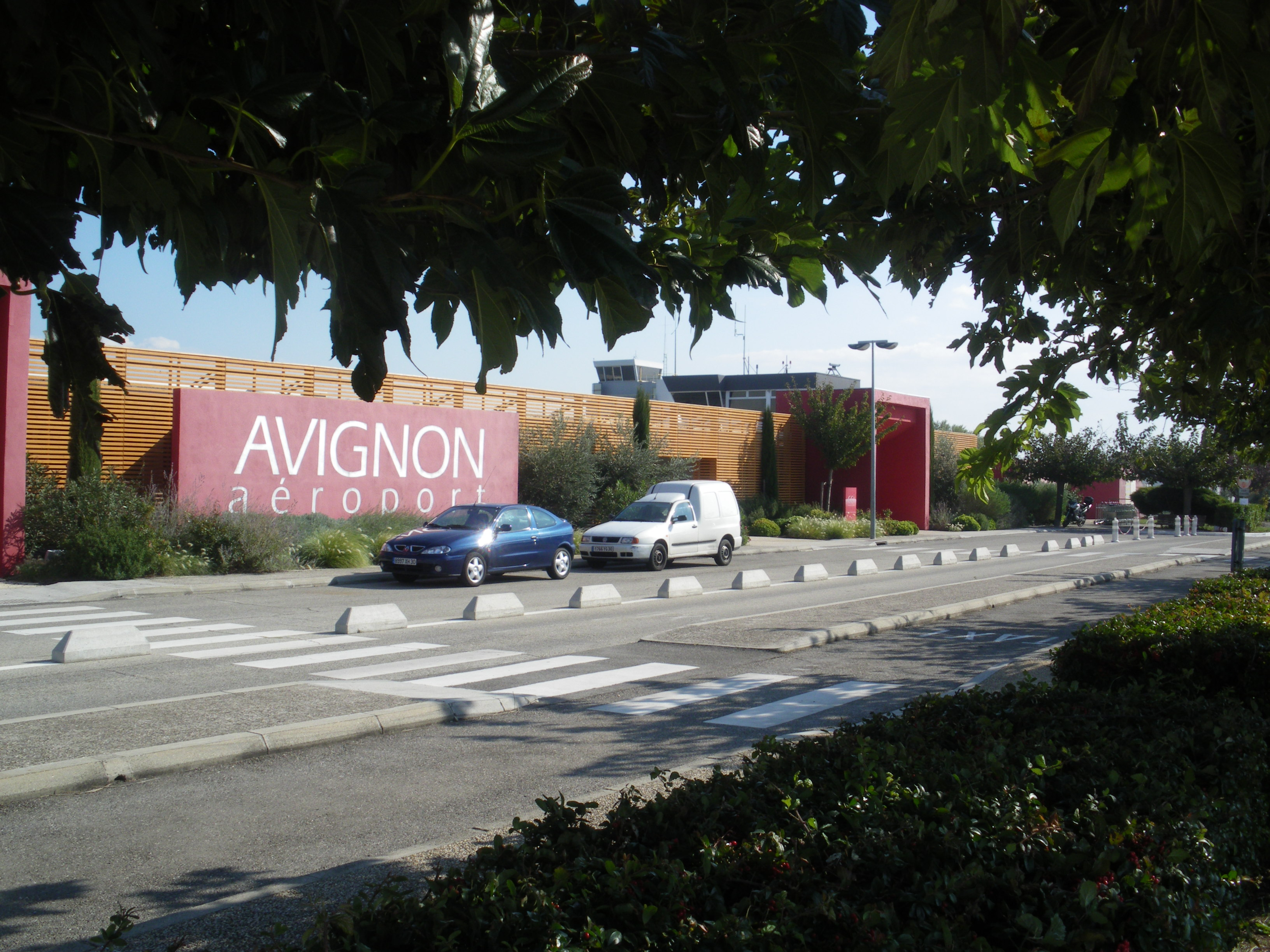
- IATA: AVN; ICAO: LFMV

Summary
- Airport type: Public
- Operator: CCI Vaucluse
- Location: Avignon, France
- Elevation AMSL: 124 ft / 38 m
- Coordinates: 43°54′24″N 004°54′07″E
- Website: www.avignon.aeroport.fr

Map
- Location in Provence-Alpes-Côte d'Azur region LFMV (France)

Runways
Direction	Length		Surface
Direction	m	ft	Surface
17/35	1,880	6,168	Asphalt
17R/35L	700	2,297	Grass
17L/35R	250	820	Grass
- Source: French AIP

Avignon–Provence Airport (French: Aéroport Avignon Provence; Occitan: Aeroport Avinhon Provença, IATA: AVN, ICAO: LFMV) is an airport located in the city of Avignon and 4 kilometres (2 mi) west of Caumont-sur-Durance, in the Vaucluse department of the Provence-Alpes-Côte d'Azur region in France.

== Facilities ==
The airport resides at an elevation of 38 metres (125 ft) above mean sea level. It has one paved runway designated 17/35 which measures 1,880 by 45 metres (6,168 ft × 148 ft). It also has two parallel grass runways: 17R/35L measuring 700 by 50 metres (2,297 ft × 164 ft) and 17L/35R measuring 250 by 20 metres (820 ft × 66 ft). The shorter grass runway is for use by ultralight aircraft.
