= Hôtel de Ville, Avignon =

Town hall in Avignon, France

Hôtel de Ville
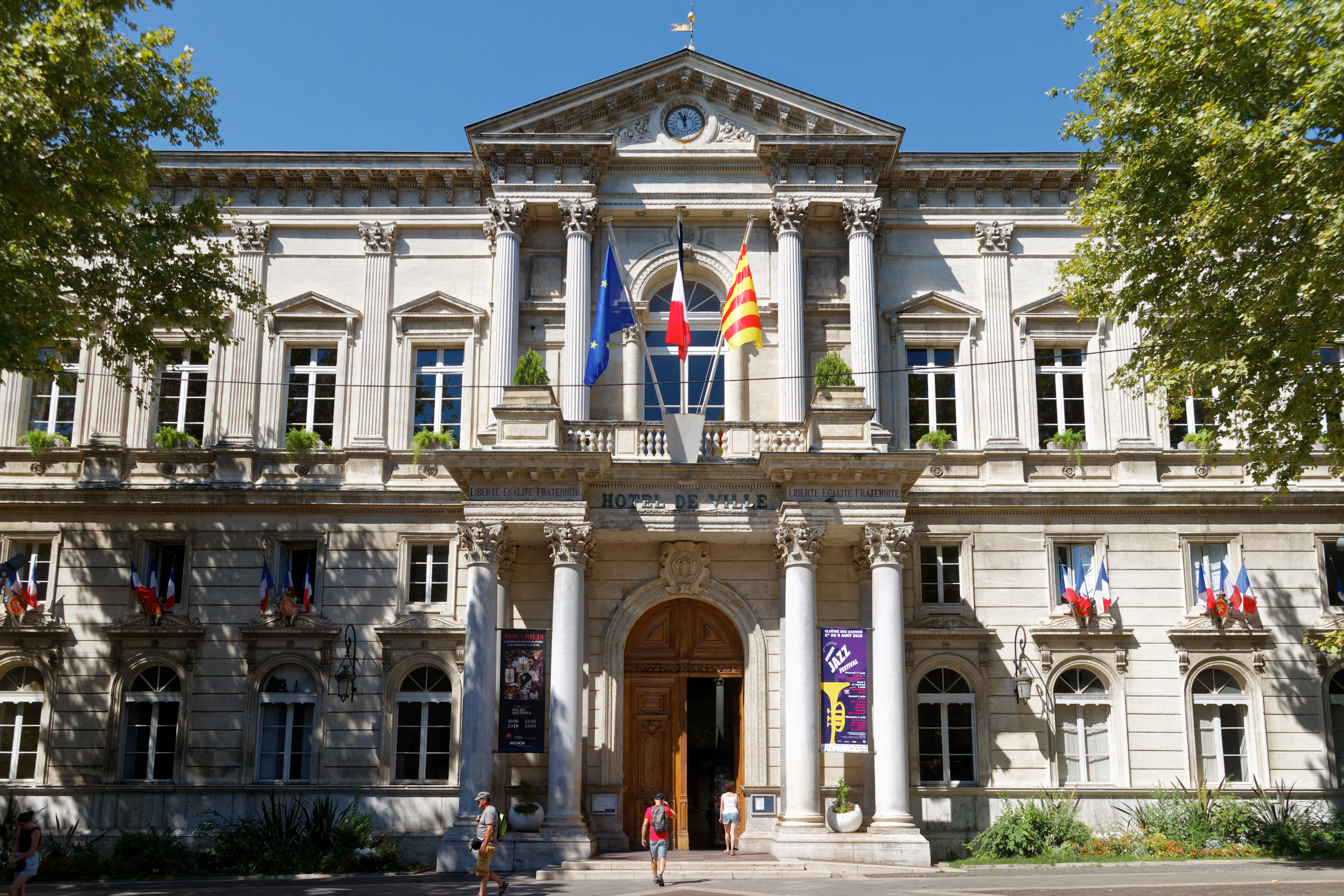
- The main frontage of the Hôtel de Ville in August 2018

General information
- Type: City hall
- Architectural style: Neoclassical style
- Location: Avignon, France
- Coordinates: 43.9493°N 4.8053°E
- Completed: 1856

Design and construction
- Architects: Joseph-Auguste Joffroy and Léon Feuchère

Monument historique
- Official name: Hôtel de ville
- Type: Inscrit
- Designated: 1862
- Reference no.: PA00081880

The Hôtel de Ville (French pronunciation: [otɛl də vil], City Hall; Occitan: Ostal de Vila) is a historic building in Avignon, Vaucluse, southern France, standing on the Place de l'Horloge. It was designated a monument historique by the French government in 1862.

== History ==
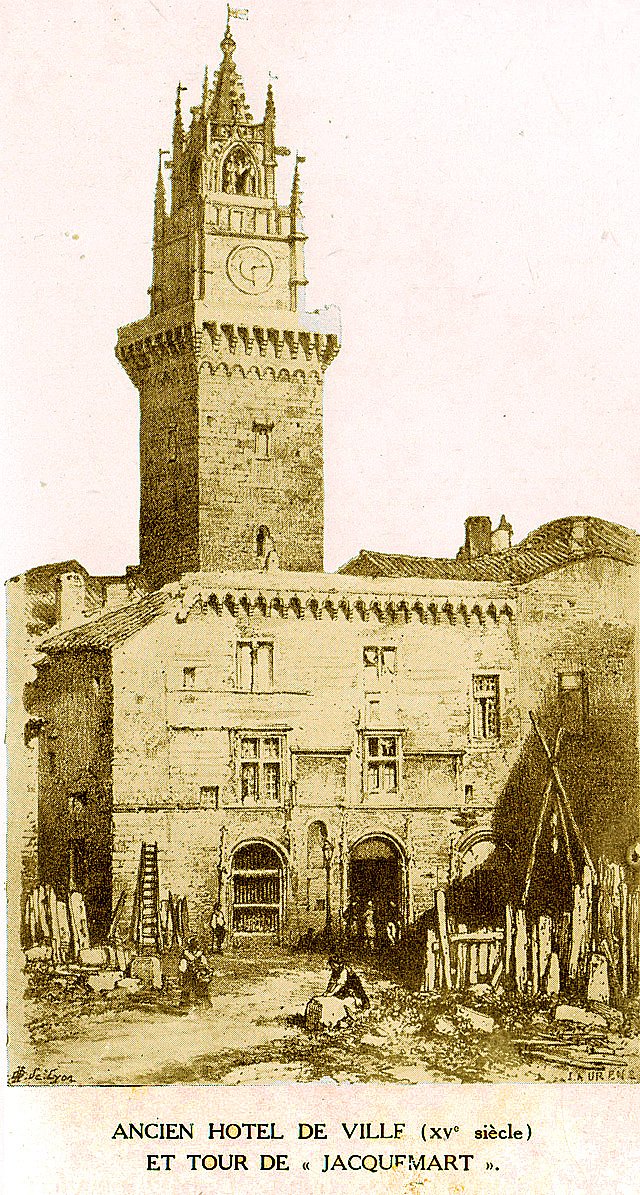
The old municipal buildings of 1447 with the belfry behind

The oldest part of the current complex is the belfry which was commissioned by Cardinal Andouin Aubert: it was designed in the Gothic style and completed in 1363. During the following century the apostolic palace of the Bishop of Albano developed around the belfry. In 1447, during the residency of Bishop Pierre de Foix, who was the papal legate in Avignon, the town council acquired the apostolic palace from the Benedictines of the Convent of St. Laurence and converted it for municipal use. A clock, equipped with colourful jacquemarts to strike the hour, was installed in the belfry in 1471.

On 10 June 1790, during the Avignon–Comtat Venaissin War, pro-papacy aristocratic forces attempted to take over the building. The situation was resolved by the intervention of the French mayor of nearby Orange and a detachment of National Guards.

In the mid-19th century, the town council decided to demolish the former apostolic palace and erect a purpose-built town hall. The proposed design involved enclosing the old belfry within the new structure. The foundation stone was laid on 29 March 1845, and work on the new building proceeded under the direction of the city architect, Joseph-Auguste Joffroy. The new façade was designed by Léon Feuchère in the neoclassical style, built in ashlar stone and was officially opened by Napoleon III in the presence of the mayor, Paul Poncet, on 24 September 1856.

The design involved a symmetrical main frontage of 11 bays facing onto the Place de l'Horloge. The central bay featured a round headed doorway with a moulded surround flanked by two pairs of Corinthian order columns supporting a modillioned entablature. On the first floor, there was a French door leading out onto a balustraded balcony flanked by two more pairs of Corinthian order columns supporting an open-modillioned pediment with a clock in the tympanum. The wings of five bays each were fenestrated by rounded headed windows on the ground floor, small casement windows on the mezzanine floor and tall pedimented casement windows on the first floor. The first-floor windows were flanked by Corinthian order pilasters supporting a modillioned cornice. Internally, the principal room was the Salle des Fêtes, which was richly decorated in the Second Empire style.

The architectural historian, Prosper Mérimée, was highly critical of the concept of embedding the belfry in the new building: "On voit ici la tour gothique du Jacquemart, seule partie conservée de l'ancien hôtel de ville, qui émerge de la mairie comme les perdrix dans les pâtés de Pithiviers." (English: Here we see the Gothic tower of Jacquemart, the only preserved part of the old town hall, which emerges from the town hall like partridges in the pâtés of Pithiviers.)

The newly elected president of France, Raymond Poincaré, visited the building on 14 October 1913. Following the liberation of Avignon by troops of the French First Army, under the command of General Jean de Lattre de Tassigny on 25 August 1944, during the Second World War, a plaque was installed in the town hall to commemorate the event.
