= Archdiocese of Avignon =

Catholic archdiocese in France

Coordinates: 43°57′N 4°50′E

Archdiocese of Avignon Archidioecesis Avenionensis Archidiocèse d'Avignon

Catholic
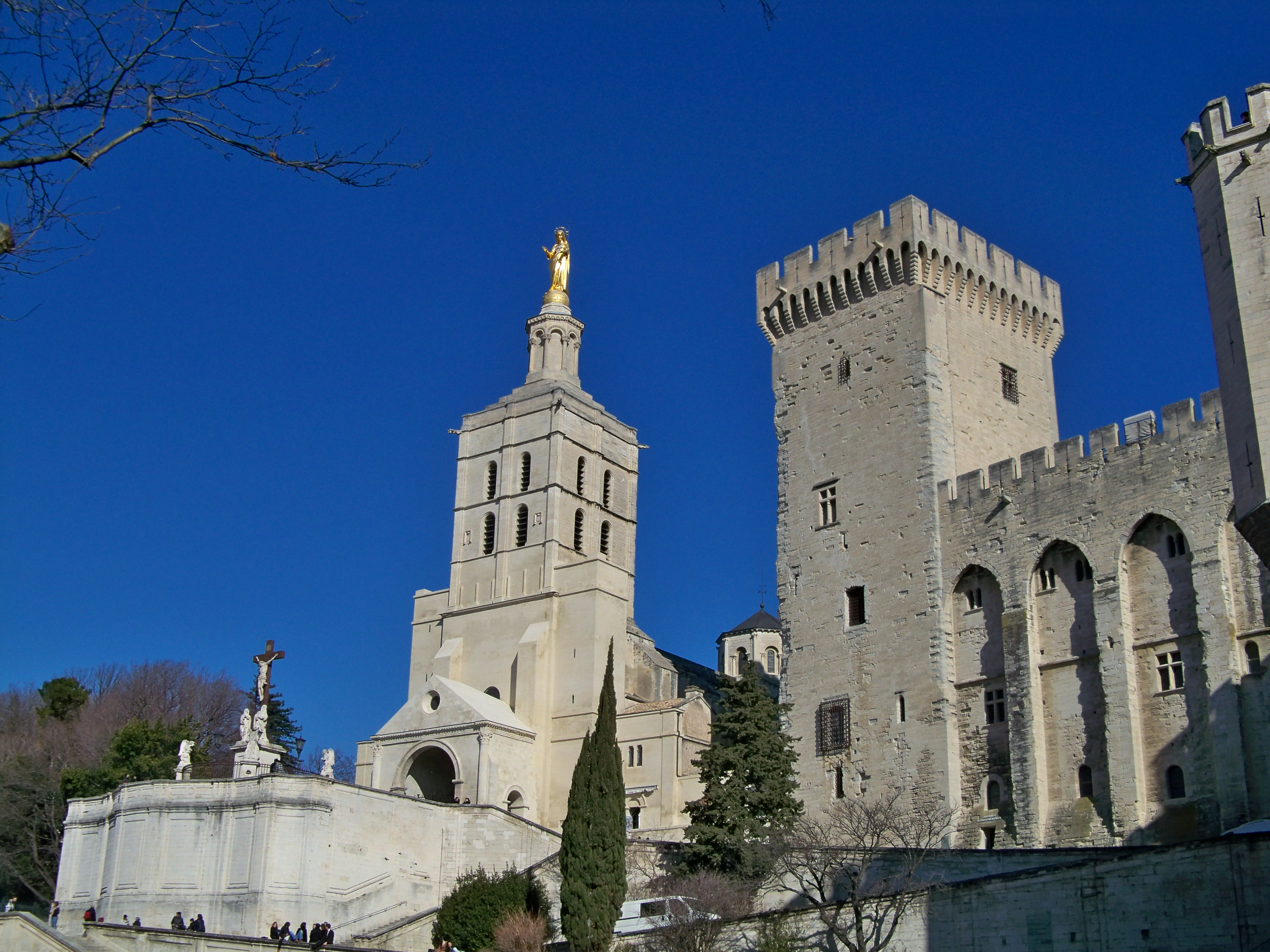
- Avignon Cathedral

Location
- Country: France
- Ecclesiastical province: Marseille
- Metropolitan: Archdiocese of Marseille

Statistics
- Area: 3,578 km^{2} (1,381 sq mi)
- Population: Total; Catholics: (as of 2022); 561,469; 450,000 (80.1%)
- Parishes: 173

Information
- Denomination: Roman Catholic
- Sui iuris church: Latin Church
- Rite: Roman Rite
- Established: 4th Century
- Cathedral: Cathedral Basilica of Notre Dame des Doms
- Patron saint: Notre-Dame; St. Agricola of Avignon
- Secular priests: 88 (Diocesan); 47 (Religious Orders); 22 Permanent Deacons

Current leadership
- Pope: Leo XIV
- Archbishop: François Fonlupt
- Bishops emeritus: Jean-Pierre Cattenoz

Map

Website
- Website of the Archdiocese

The Archdiocese of Avignon (Latin: Archidioecesis Avenionensis; French: Archidiocèse d'Avignon) is a Latin archdiocese of the Catholic Church in France. The diocese exercises jurisdiction over the territory embraced by the department of Vaucluse, in the Region of Provence-Alpes-Côte d'Azur. It is named for the prefecture of Avignon. The diocese has been led since January 2021 by Archbishop Georges Pontier, whom Pope Francis called out of retirement to serve as Apostolic Administrator.

Established in the 4th century as the Diocese of Avignon, the diocese was elevated to an archdiocese in 1475, (Note: On 21 November 1475) with the suffragan sees of the Diocese of Carpentras, the Diocese of Vaison, and the Diocese of Cavaillon. By the Concordat of 1801 these three dioceses were united to Avignon, together with the Diocese of Apt, a suffragan of the Archdiocese of Aix. At the same time, however, Avignon was reduced to the rank of a bishopric and was made a suffragan see of Aix. (Note: On 29 November 1801)

The Archdiocese of Avignon was re-established in 1822, (Note: On 6 October 1822) and received as suffragan sees the Diocese of Viviers (restored in 1822); Diocese of Valence (formerly under Lyon); Diocese of Nîmes (restored in 1822); and Diocese of Montpellier (formerly under Toulouse).

On 16 December 2002, the see – officially Archdiocese of Avignon (-Apt, Cavaillon, Carpentras, Orange, and Vaison) – lost its Metropolitan status and became instead a suffragan see of Marseille. In 2009 its name was changed to Archdiocese of Avignon, the secondary titles being suppressed.

== History ==
There is no evidence that either Saint Rufus, disciple of Saint Paul according to certain traditions the son of Simon of Cyrene, or Saint Justus, likewise held in high honour throughout the territory of Avignon, was venerated in antiquity as bishop of that see. The first bishop known to history is Nectarius, who took part in several councils about the middle of the fifth century. Saint Agricol (Agricolus), bishop between 650 and 700, is the patron saint of Avignon.

In 1475 Pope Sixtus IV raised the diocese of Avignon to the rank of an archbishopric, in favour of his nephew Giuliano della Rovere who later became Pope Julius II.

== Bishops ==
=== To 1000 ===
- ? - 100: Saint Simon of Cyrene
- 3rd of 4th century: Saint Ruf
- 439–451: Nectarius
- 465: Saturinus
- 475–507: Julianus
- 524–540: Eucherius
- 541–554: Antonius
- 585: Johannes
- 618: Maximus
- 7th century: Saint Veredème
- 7th century (683?): Saint Agricol
- 855: Ragenutius
- 860–876: Hilduinus
- 876–879: Ratifridus

=== 1000 to 1474 ===
- mentioned 1002: Pierre
- before 1006–1033: Heldebert
- 1033–1036: Senioret
- 1037– after 1047: Benoît I
- before 1050– after 1173: Rostaing II
- 1095– after 1120: Albert
- before 1124–1142: Laugerius
- 1148–after 1148: Geoffroy I
- 1173–1174: Raymond I
- 1174–1177: Geoffroy II
- 1178–1180: Pontius
- 1180–1197: Rostaing III de Marguerite
- 1197–1209: Rostaing IV
- 1209–1216 death: Guillaume I de Montelier
- mentioned 1225: Pierre II
- before 1226– after 1230: Nicolas de Corbie
- mentioned 1238: Benedictus
- 1242–1261 death: Zoen Tencarari
- 1264–1266: Bertrand de Saint-Martin
- 1267– c. 1287 death: Robert d'Uzès
- mentioned 1288: Benoît III
- 1290– after 1294: André de Languiscel
- 1300–1310: Bertrandus Aymini
- 1310–1312: Jacques Duèze, later Pope John XXII
- 1313–1317: Jacques de Via (nephew of John XXII)
- 1317–1334: John XXII (again)
- 1336–1349: Jean de Cojordan
- 1349–1352 death: Clement VI
- 1352–1362 death: Innocent VI
- 1362–1366: Anglicus Grimoard (brother Pope Urban V)
- 1366–1367: Urban V
- 1367–1368: Philippe de Cabassole
- 1368–1371 death: Pierre d'Aigrefeuille
- 1371–1383: Faydit d'Aigrefeuille
- 1391–1394: Clement VII (antipope)
- 1394–1398: Benedict XIII (antipope)
- 1398–1406: Gilles de Bellamere
- 1410–1412: Pierre V de Tourroye
- 1412–1415: Simond de Cramaud
- 1415–1419: Guy I de Roussillon-Bouchage
- 1419–1422: Guy II Spifame
- 1422–1432: Guy III de Roussillon-Bouchage
- 1432–1433: Marco Condulmer
- 1437–1474: Alain de Coëtivy

== Archbishops ==
- 1474–1503: Giuliano della Rovere (Archbishop from 1475)
- 1503–1512: Antoine Florès
- 1512–1517: Orlando Carretto della Rovere (Orland de Roure)
- 1517–1535: Hippolyte de' Medici
- 1535–1551: Alessandro Farnese the Younger
- 1551–1562: Annibale Bozzuti (Annibal Buzzutto)
- 1566–1576: Félicien Capitone
- 1577–1585: Georges d'Armagnac
- 1585–1592: Domenico Grimaldi
- 1592–1598: François-Marie Thaurusi (Francesco Maria Tarugi)
- 1598–1609: Jean-François Bordini
- 1609–1624: Etienne II Dulci
- 1624–1644: Marius Philonardi
- 1644–1647: Bernard III Pinelli
- 1647–1649: César Argelli
- 1649–1669: Domenico de' Marini
- 1669–1672: Azzo Ariosto
- 1673–1686: Hyacinthe Libelli
- 1686–1689: Alexandre II Montecatini
- 1690–1705: Lorenzo Fieschi
- 1705–1717: François Maurice Gonteri
- 1742–1757: Joseph Guyon de Crochans
- 1757–1775: François Maria Manzi
- 1775–1790: Carlo Vincenzo Giovio
- 1793–1794: François-Régis Rovère
- 1798: François Etienne
- 1802–1817: Jean-François Périer
- 1821–1830: Etienne-Parfait-Martin Maurel de Mons
- 1831–1834: Louis-Joseph d'Humières
- 1834–1842: Célestin Dupont (Jacques-Marie-Antoine-Célestin du Pont) (later Archbishop of Bourges)
- 1842–1848: Paul Naudo
- 1848–1863: Jean-Marie-Mathias Debelay
- 1863–1880: Louis-Anne Dubreuil

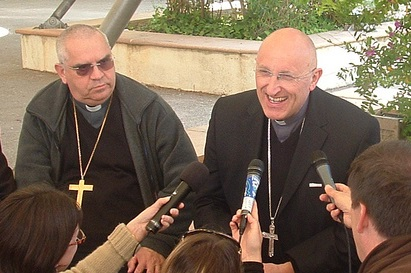
Archbishop Jean-Pierre Cattenoz (left) and Dominique Rey

- 1880–1884: François-Edouard Hasley (later Archbishop of Cambrai)
- 1885–1895: Louis-Joseph-Marie-Ange Vigne
- 1896–1907: Louis-François Sueur
- 1907–1928: Gaspard-Marie-Michel-André Latty
- 1928–1957: Gabriel-Roch de Llobet
- 1957–1970: Joseph-Martin Urtasun
- 1970–1978: Eugène-Jean-Marie Polge
- 1978–2002: Raymond Bouchex
- 2002–2021: Jean-Pierre Marie Cattenoz
- 2021–present: François Fonlupt

== See also ==
- Catholic Church in France
- List of Catholic dioceses in France
- Timeline of Avignon

== Sources ==
- Delaunay, Cécile (20 June 2016). "L'Épiscopat francais depuis 1919" (PDF). Centre national des Archives de l'Église de France. Archived from the original (PDF) on 10 May 2017.
- Duprat, E. (1908). "Les origines de l'église d'Avignon". Mémoires de l'Académie de Vaucluse (in French). 8: 373–405.
- Duprat, E. (1909a). "Les origines de l'église d'Avignon (suite)". Mémoires de l'Académie de Vaucluse (in French). 9: 1–50.
- Duprat, E. (1909b). "Les origines de l'église d'Avignon (suite et fin)". Mémoires de l'Académie de Vaucluse (in French). 9: 105–168.
- Eubel, Conradus, ed. (1913). Hierarchia catholica (in Latin). Vol. 1 (1198–1431) (2nd ed.). Münster: Libreria Regensbergiana. pp. 123–124.
- Eubel, Conradus, ed. (1914). Hierarchia catholica (in Latin). Vol. 2 (1431–1503) (2nd ed.). Münster: Libreria Regensbergiana. p. 100.
- Eubel, Conradus, ed. (1923). Hierarchia catholica (in Latin). Vol. 3 (1503–1592) (2nd ed.). Münster: Libreria Regensbergiana. pp. 126–127.
- Gagnière, Sylvain; et al. (1979). Histoire d'Avignon (in French). Aix-en-Provence, France: Édisud. ISBN 2-85744-056-1.
- Gams, Pius Bonifacius (1857). Series episcoporum Ecclesiae catholicae (in Latin). Graz: Akademische Druck- u. Verlagsanstalt. pp. 503–505.
- Gauchat, Patritius (Patrice) (1935). Hierarchia catholica (in Latin). Vol. 4 (1592–1667). Münster: Libraria Regensbergiana. pp. 105–106.
- Girard, Joseph (1958). Évocation du Vieil Avignon (in French). Paris: Les Éditions de Minuit. OCLC 5391399.
- Palanque, Jean-Rémy (1951). "Les évêchés provençaux à l'époque romaine" (PDF). Provence Historique (in French). 1 (3): 105–143.
- Ritzler, Remigium; Sefrin, Pirinum, eds. (1952). Hierarchia catholica (in Latin). Vol. 5 (1667–1730). Münster: Monasterii Sumptibus. p. 109.
- Ritzler, Remigium; Sefrin, Pirinum, eds. (1958). Hierarchia catholica (in Latin). Vol. 6 (1730–1799). Münster: Monasterii Sumptibus. p. 111.
