= Papes =

Papes may refer to:

- Pap of Armenia (also called Papes, 353–375), King of Armenia
- Raša Papeš (born 1947), Serbian writer
- Lake Pape (Latvian: Papes ezers, lit. 'Papes Lake'), Latvia; a lagoon

== See also ==
- Enclave des Papes, Valréas, Vaucluse, Avignon, Provence, France; the domains of the Avignon Papacy
- Palais des papes of Sorgues, Sorgues, Avignon, Vaucluse, Provence-Alpes-Côte d'Azur, France; a palace of the Avignon Papacy in Provence
- Palais des Papes of Avignon, Avignon, Vaucluse, Provence-Alpes-Côte d'Azur, France; a palace of the Avignon Papacy in Provence
- Pape (disambiguation) for the singular of Papes
