= Palace of the Popes =

Palace of the Pope, Papal Palace, Popes Palace, is the residence of a pope, and may refer to:

- Apostolic Palace, Vatican City State – the pope's residence since the return from Avignon in 1377
- Domus Sanctae Marthae (Latin: Saint Martha's House), Vatican City – the Vatican hotel where Pope Francis resided during his reign as Pope
- Lateran Palace, Rome, Italy – used from the 4th century until 1309
- Palais des Papes (French: Palace of the Popes), Avignon, Provence, France – used from 1309 to 1377
- Palais des papes of Sorgues, Provence, France – used during the Avignon Papacy
- Palazzo dei Papi (Italian: Palace of the Popes), Orvieto, Italy – used from 1262 to 1297
- Palace of the Popes in Viterbo, Italy – used from 1257 to 1281
- Palace of the Popes in Anagni, Italy – used from 1227 to 1241, 1296 to 1303
- Papal Palace of Castel Gandolfo, Castel Gandolfo, Lazio, Italy – the pope's summer residence prior to 2016, temporary residence of Pope Emeritus Benedict XVI
- Quirinal Palace, Rome, Italy – used from 1589 to 1870

== See also ==
- Pope Palace, Pope Parish, Ventspils Municipality, Courland, Latvia; a manor in western Latvia
