= Vladimir Bulatović Vib =

Serbian writer (1931–1994)

- Born: Vladimir Bulatović; 8 March 1931; Sopotsko, Kingdom of Yugoslavia (now North Macedonia)
- Died: 1 September 1994 (aged 63); Belgrade, FR Yugoslavia
- Occupations: Satirist, short-story writer, aphorist, journalist, newspaper editor
- Writing career
- Genres: Aphorism, satire, journals

Vladimir Bulatović Vib (Serbian Cyrillic: Владимир Булатовић Виб; 8 March 1931 – 1 September 1994) was a Serbian writer, satirist, aphorist, journalist and editor.

== Life and work ==
Bulatović Vib was born in Sopotsko in the Kingdom of Yugoslavia (in what is now North Macedonia). He studied journalism and diplomacy and graduated from the University of Belgrade Faculty of Philosophy.

He was a longtime editor of Politika and chief editor of Politikin Zabavnik from 1984 to 1987. He was voted the best satirist of all time in a poll for the magazine Rhino.

His works include:

- Budilnik (satire, 1961.)
- Veliko spremanje (1971)
- Korak nazad: aforizmi (aphorisms, 1976.)
- Šta je pisac hteo da kaže (1981)

== Vib Award ==
The Vib Award, named after Vlada Bulatović Vib, was established in 1994 and is given to young writers for their contributions to the field of satire.
