= Raša Papeš =

Serbian writer, satirist and aphorist (born 1947)

- Born: Radislav Papeš; 17 July 1947; Belgrade, Čubura, SFR Yugoslavia
- Occupations: Satirist, short-story writer, Aphorist, Black humor writer
- Writing career
- Genres: Aphorism, Satire, black humor

Radislav Raša Papeš (Serbian Cyrillic: Радислав Раша Папеш) is a Serbian writer, satirist and aphorist, born in 1947 in Belgrade, in the urban settlement known as Čubura (Serbian Cyrillic: Чубура).

He writes short stories and aphorisms that are published in many newspapers and magazines such as Nin, Literary Word (Serbian Cyrillic: Књижевна Реч), Hedgehog (Serbian Cyrillic: Јеж), Ecspress Politics, Politika, Danga, Evening News ( Večernje novosti ) and Independent Lightness. He has been published in 70 national and international anthologies of satire and stories. His works has been translated into English, German, Polish, Russian, Romanian, Bulgarian and Macedonian. He lives and works as a dentist in Kragujevac.

== Awards and prizes ==
He is a winner of the Hedgehog Awards for the aphorism from 1981. He has been awarded in 1988 with the special prize for the Black Aphorism at the festival in Vogošća just like in the following year. The first book of aphorisms Masks of Delight he published in 1997 and in the following year he received award of Radoje Domanović for the best book of aphorisms of that year. He also got the prize of Radio Belgrade for the aphorism he received in 1989 and 2003 on festival of humor in Sarajevo in 1991. He won the third prize for aphorism in award of Radoje Domanović for the best satirical prose he won in 1995 and for the best book of aphorisms, Masks of Delight, in 1998. In Kruševac he was the winner of Golden Helmet for the aphorism in 1994 and for the satiric story in 2000 and 2003. After many years of calm and hard work he finally published a book of short stories Chinese Chalk in 2007 and two years later a new book of aphorisms The Fundamental Bottom. Cultural and Educational Community of Serbia has awarded him with Gold Badge in 2007 as a reward for the unselfish work and spreading the culture. In Belgrade 16 October 2008. the company Novosti AD was awarded him the prize Jovan Hadži Kostić on the 55th anniversary of newspapers Večernje novosti. In Belgrade he received the award Radoje Domanović for the third time, for best book of aphorisms 2009th The fundamental bottom in December 2010. On the ninth international Satire festival 2011th in Belgrade he won the award for the best short story Last Train, on the day marking the eighty years since the birth of Vladimir Bulatović Vib, 6 October.

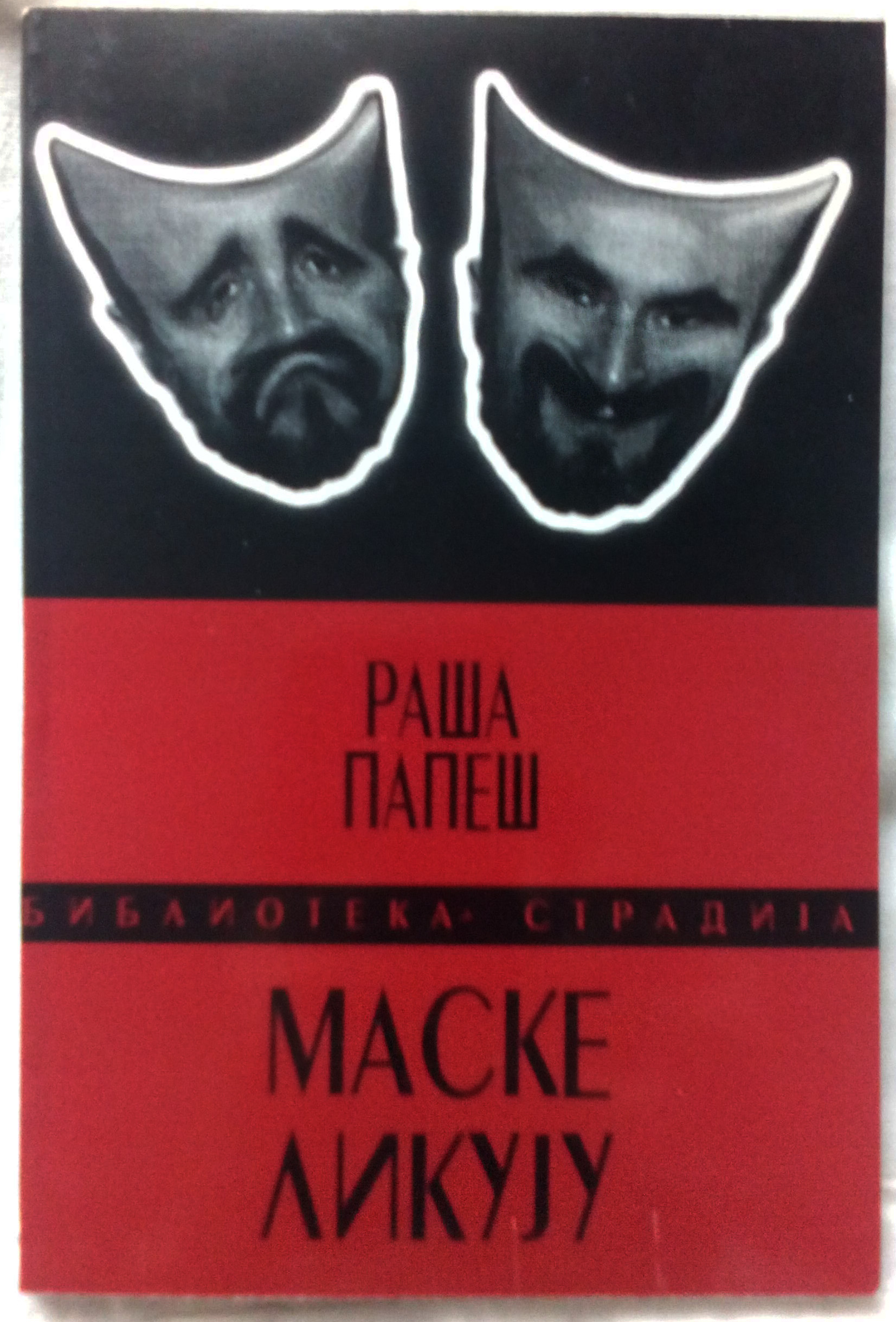
Book Masks of delight published at 1997, winner of Radoje Domanović award for the best book of aphorisms.

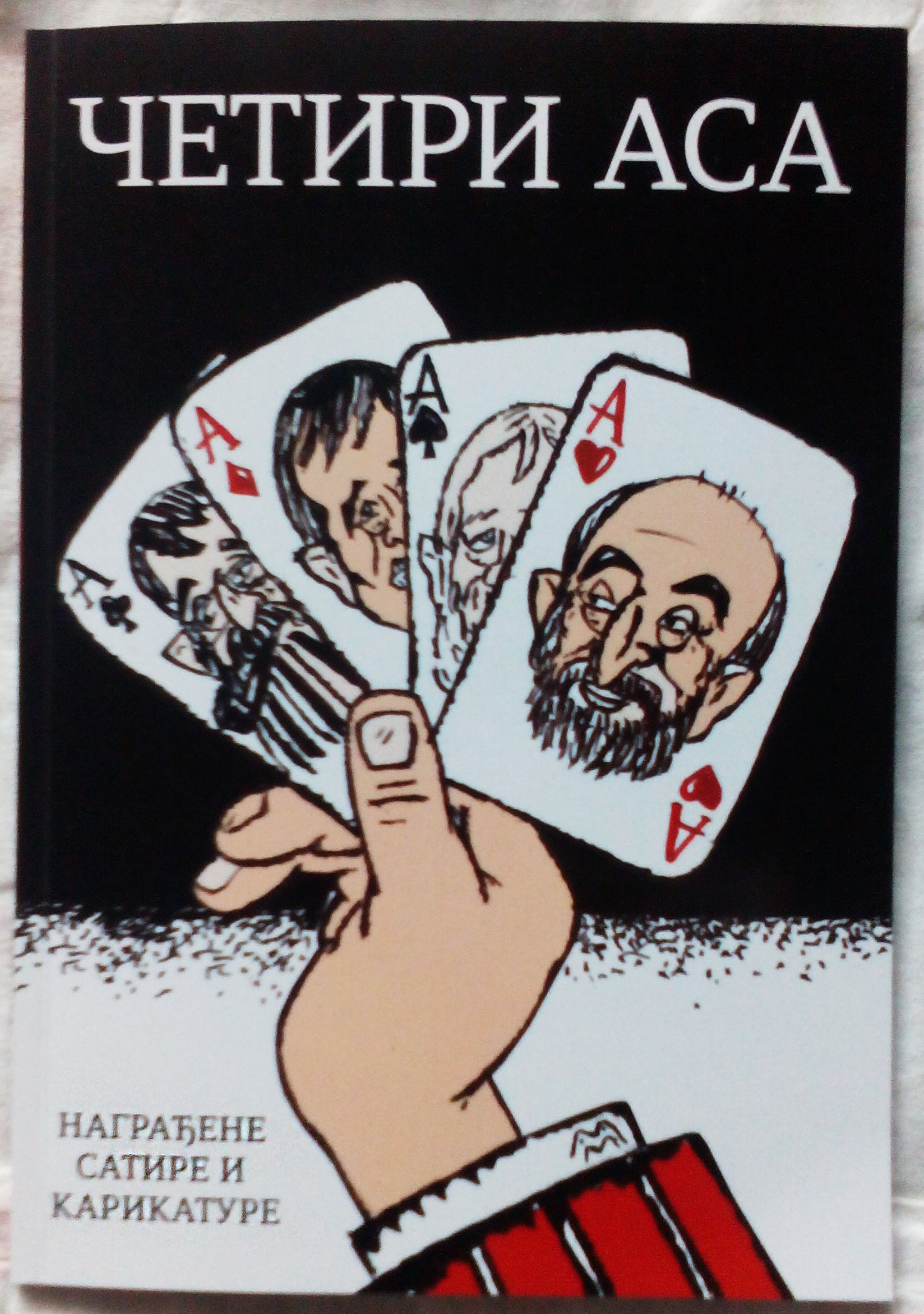
Book Fore aces 2016. Awarded satire and cartoons.

== Anthologies ==
- Breaking the Spineless (aphorisms, Serbia, Požega 1988. )
- Seal of time (aphorisms, Serbia, Kragujevac 1988. )
- Disobedient Boomerang (aphorisms, Serbia, Belgrade 1989. )
- Listening to silence (satirical stories, Serbia, Belgrade 1989. )
- The beating of hourglass (stories, Serbia, Belgrade 1990. )
- Test tube, happy 8th March - YU graffiti (graffiti, Serbia, Belgrade 1990. )
- Irren ist menschlich und patriotisch - Serbische Aphorismen aus dem Krieg (aphorisms, Germany, Salzburg 1994. )
- The capital of laughter (aphorisms, Serbia, Kruševac 1996. )
- Skills for winking to the moon (stories, Serbia, Belgrade 1996. )
- Guardians of ozone (stories, Serbia, Belgrade 1997. )
- Who's who in our humor, satire and caricature (humor and satire, Serbia, Belgrade 1998. )
- Without a mask (satire, Montenegro, Nikšić 1999. )
- Crossword thoughts (aphorisms, Serbia, Belgrade 2000. )
- The Devil and a joke (aphorisms, Serbia, Belgrade 2000. )
- POSTLUDUS (aphorisms, Serbia, New Belgrade 2001. )
- Graffiti and aphorisms (aphorisms, Serbia, Belgrade 2001. )
- Shortest stories 2002 (stories, Serbia, Belgrade 2002. )
- Aphorisms and aphorists - volume 1, 3, 4, 6, 7 and 8 (aphorisms, Serbia, Belgrade 2002. - 2007. )
- First competition for satirical and nonsatirical aphorism (aphorisms, Serbia, Belgrade 2002. )
- Who slandered Dis? (satirical stories, Serbia, Belgrade 2002. )
- Shortest stories 2003 (stories, Serbia, Belgrade 2003. )
- Черт и Шутка - The Devil and a joke (aphorisms, Russia, Moscow 2003. )
- Anthology of humor and satire from Čivijada (satire, Serbia, Šabac 2003. )
- In the story, and around (stories, Serbia, Belgrade 2003.)
- Grammar in shorts 2 (satire, Serbia, Belgrade 2003. )
- Stradija today ( satire, Serbia, Belgrade 2003. )
- Shortest stories 2004 (stories, Serbia, Belgrade 2004. )
- satirical stories 2003 (satirical stories, Serbia, Belgrade 2004. )
- Encyclopedia of aphorism 1 and 2 (aphorisms, Serbia, Belgrade 2004.)
- The bottom side of the story (stories, Serbia, Belgrade 2004. )
- Unsolicited stories - anecdotes of legendary people of Kragujevac (anecdotes, Kragujevac 2004. )
- And then Noah's Ark was intercepted by nuclear submarine ( graffiti, Serbia, Belgrade 2004. )
- Осриганият Таралеж - антология на съвремената сръбска сатира (aphorisms, Bulgaria, Sofia 2004. )
- Shortest stories 2005 (stories, Serbia, Belgrade 2005. )
- The doors of my story (stories, Serbia, Belgrade 2005. )
- Serbian secret weapon (antiwar aphorisms and cartoons, Serbia, Belgrade 2005. )
- Shortest stories 2006 (stories, Serbia, Belgrade 2006. )
- And after story, story (stories, Serbia, Belgrade 2006. )
- Alice in story world (stories, Serbia, Belgrade 2006. )
- Accidental cause (aphorisms, Serbia, Belgrade 2006. )
- Shortest stories 2007 (stories, Serbia, Belgrade 2007. )
- One sided stories (stories, Serbia, Belgrade 2007. )
- Anthology of Serbian satire (satire, Serbia, Belgrade 2007. )
- A small anthology of Serbian satire ( satire, Serbia, Belgrade 2007. )
- Aphorism anthologies for children and youth (aphorisms, Serbia, Belgrade 2007. )
- The spiritual dribbling ( aphorisms, Serbia, Belgrade 2007. )
- Men's stories ( stories, Serbia, Belgrade 2007. )
- From Stradija to Stradija ( aphorisms and criticism, Serbia, Belgrade 2007. )
- Нашите пријатели - Our friends - aphorisms from Serbia, Montenegro and Republic of Srpska (aphorisms, Republic of Macedonia, Skopje 2007. )
- Take out stories (stories, Serbia, Belgrade 2007. )
- Doctors of satire and architect of cartoons (Serbia, Belgrade 2007.)
- Shortest stories 2008 (stories, Serbia, Belgrade 2008. )
- Антологија на балканскиот афоризам - Anthology of Balkan aphorism ( aphorisms, Serbia, Belgrade 2008. )
- Shortest stories 2009 (stories, Serbia, Belgrade 2009. )
- From story to story (stories, Serbia, Belgrade 2009. )
- The diary of refusal (aphorisms, Serbia, Belgrade 2009. )
- W krzywym zwierciadle (Serbia, Belgrade 2009. )
- Антологиая мудрости - The Anthology of wisdom (aphorisms, Russia, Moscow 2010. )
- Din aforistica Serbiei - The aphorisms from Serbia (aphorisms, Romania, Timișoara 2010. )
- Miedzy Ochryda a Bugeim - From Ohrid to Bug ( anthology of slavistic art, Poland 2011. )
- Antologija Srbskih aforizmov - Anthology of Serbian aphorisms ( aphorisms, Slovenia, Trbovlje 2011. )
- Our days - Anthology of Yugoslavian days of humor and satire ( anthology, Montenegro, Pljevlja 2011. )
- Mудрость Европы ( oт Данте до Фреида) - The wisdom of Europe ( from Dante to Freud ) ( anthology, Russia, Moscow 2011. )
- Afocalypse, antologia dell' aforisma serbo - Aphocalypse, anthology of serbian aphorisms ( anthology of aphorisms, Italy, Turin 2012. )
- Humor and Nonviolent Struggle in Serbia - ( Serbian satire, Janjira Sombatpoonsiri, United States, New York City 2015. )

== Book review ==
- The Leader second time - Dragan Rajičić (satirical stories, Serbia, Kragujevac 1996. )
- Brutus, my brother - Rade Djergović (aphorisms, Serbia, Šabac 2003. )
- Plowing - Golub Lazarević (aphorisms, Serbia, Kragujevac 2008. )
- Caricaturulum Vitae - Slobodan Srdić (cartoons, Serbia, Belgrade 2008. )
- Imaginary borders of the limb - Dušan Bogdanović (book of stories, Serbia, Kragujevac 2009. )
- Guide for the masochist - Dragan Rajičić ( aphorisms, Serbia, Belgrade 2011. )

== Illustrations ==
- The guardians of smile (illustrated book of poems for children, Serbia, Kragujevac 1997. )

== Books ==
- Masks of Delight (Serbian Cyrillic: Маске Ликују) (book of aphorisms, Belgrade, 1997)
- Chinese Chalk (Serbian Cyrillic: Кинеска Креда) (book of short stories, Belgrade. 2007)
- The Fundamental Bottom (Serbian Cyrillic: Фундаментално Дно) (book of aphorisms, Belgrade, 2009)
- Four aces (Serbian Cyrillic: Четири аса) (book of awarded satire and caricatures, Kragujevac, 2016)
