= Matteo Giovanetti =

Italian painter

Matteo Giovannetti (c. 1322, in Viterbo, Latium – 1368) was an Italian painter. He worked primarily in Avignon as a member of the papal court. He is often thought to have belonged to the Simone Martini school due to some similarities of style, although there is no evidence that the two ever met. It is more plausible that he adopted a Sienese style during his education in Italy.

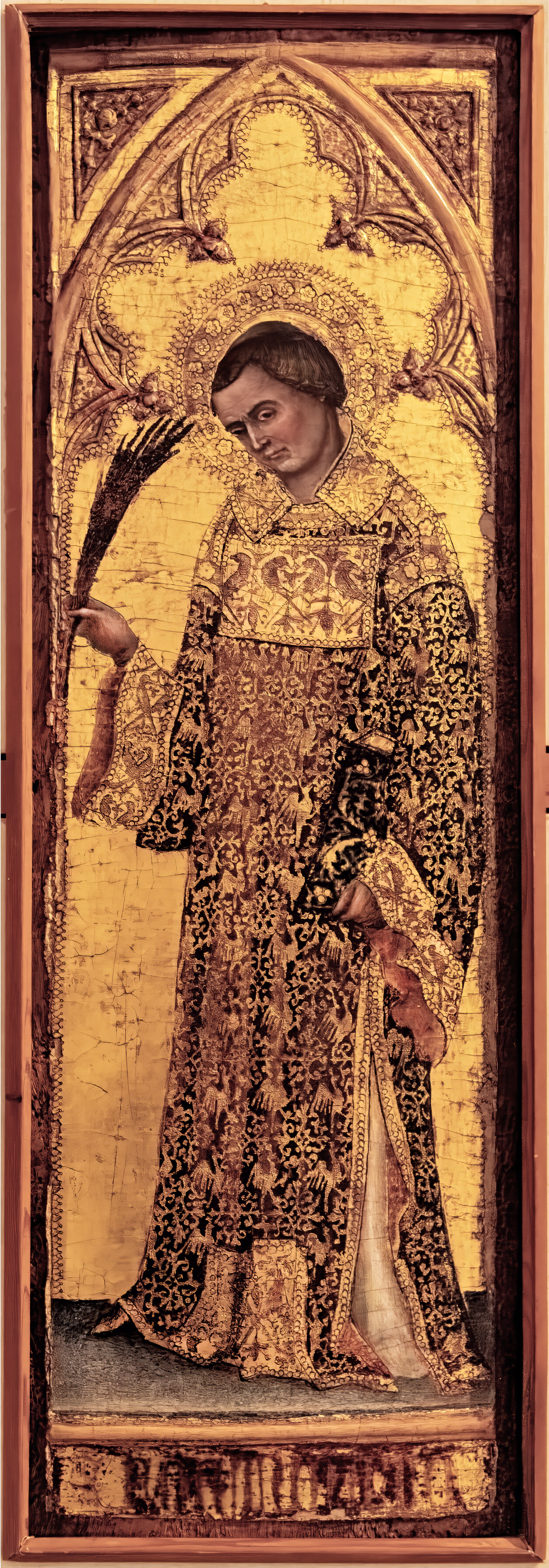
San Fortunato - Museo Correr Venice

== Life ==
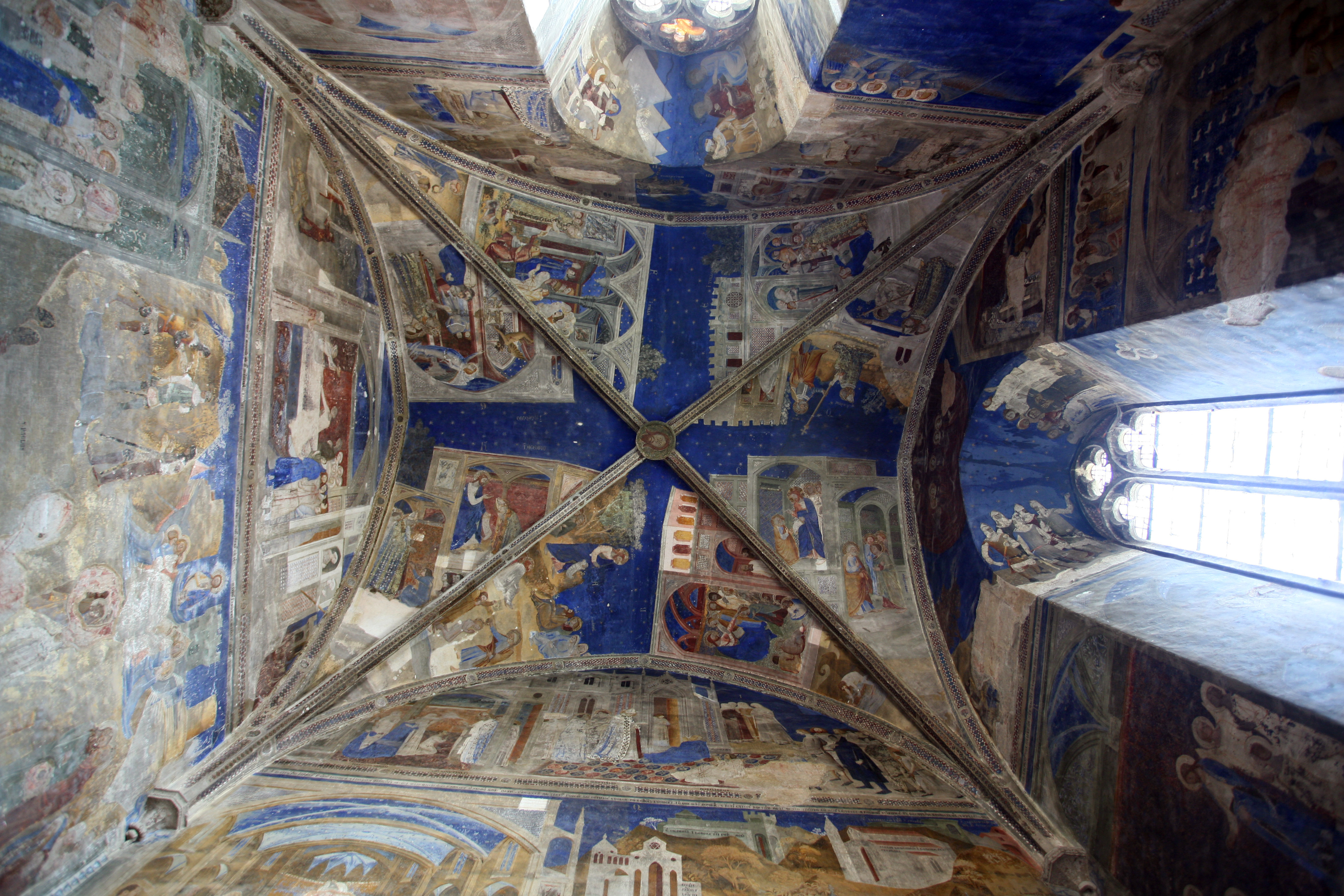
The Saint-Martial chapel

He was summoned to Avignon by pope Clement VI to decorate the Palais des Papes there. He led teams of painters from right across Europe.

He began painting the Saint-Martial chapel on 13 October 1344, which is a small chapel attached to the great dining hall, called the Grand Tinel. It was completed on 1 September 1345. From 9 January to 24 September 1345, he decorated the Saint-Michel oratory. In November 1345 he began the frescoes in the Grand Tinel (Note: Unfortunately these were destroyed in the 1413 fire) and completed them in April 1346. Then in 1347, from 12 July to 26 October, he worked on the consistory room, then on the Saint-Jean chapel.

== The Saint-Martial chapel ==
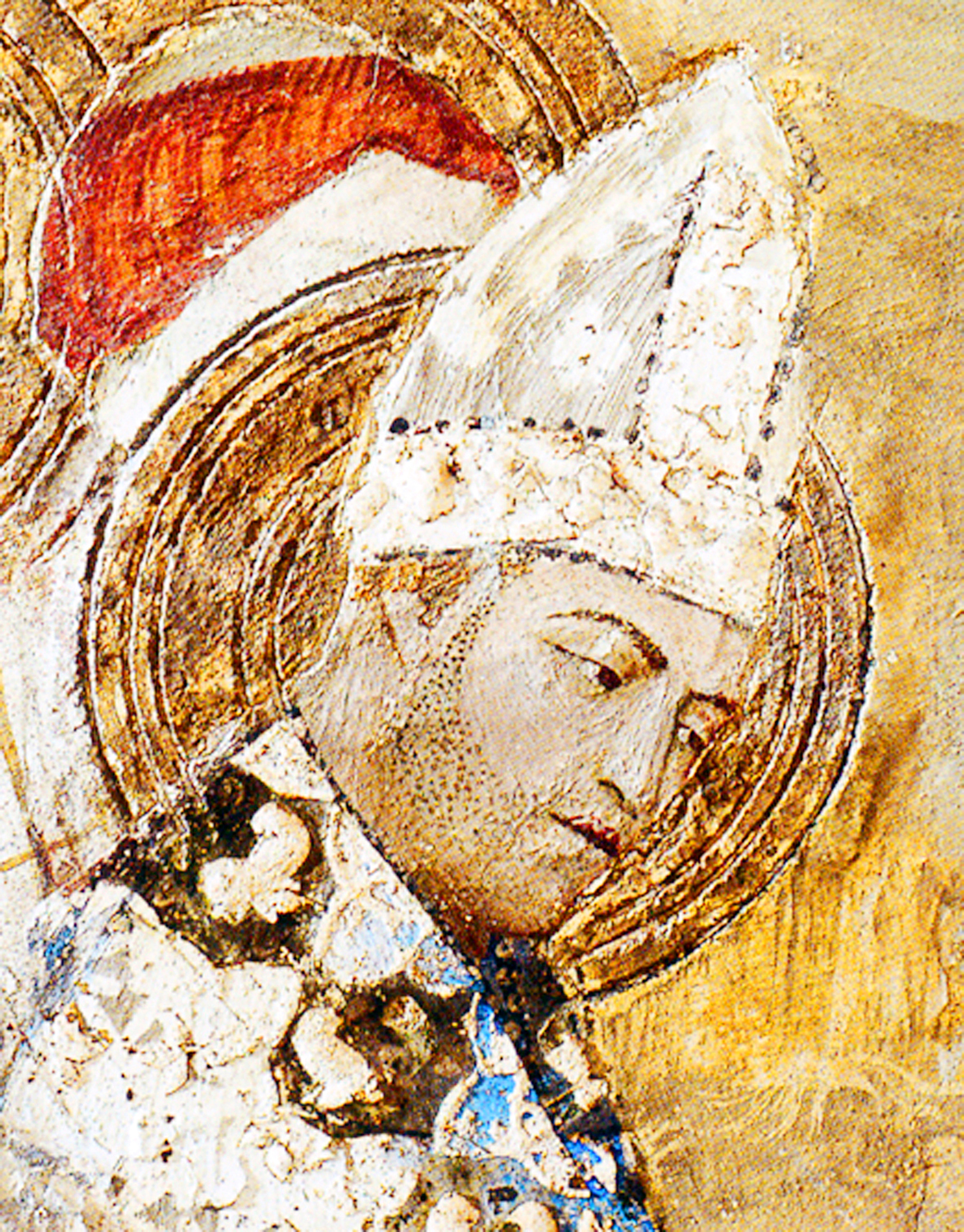
Detail of Clement VI as Saint Martial

Located on the second floor of the Saint-Jean, the chapel of Saint-Martial contains paintings of the life of Saint Martial. Giovannetti worked there between 1344 and 1345. The reading of these scenes is from top to bottom.

The rooftops of this chapel are illustrated with thirteen scenes of the early life of Saint Martial. They depict Saint Martial's encounter with Christ's teaching when he was young, his baptism, Christ's preaching, fishing, the appearance of Christ to Peter, when he sent Martial to evangelize Gaul, sending Martial with two companions in Gaul, delivery of pastoral staff of St. Pierre Martial, the healing of the daughter of Arnulfus, the resurrection of the son of Nerva, the baptism of people of Toulx and the miracle of Ahun, casting out a demon, and the healing of the paralytic.

The upper continues with seven other scenes in four panels: The resurrection of André and Aurelian; the Limoges martyrdom of St. Valerie, the ascent to heaven of the soul and the resurrection of his executioner; the Fine Honourable Duke Etienne and resurrection of Hildebert, one of his officers; the destruction of idols in Bordeaux, healing Sigibertus, count of Bordeaux and extinguishing the fire.

The middle register depicts nine scenes in four panels: Christ's appearance to Martial in Poitiers and the martyrdom of Saints Peter and Paul, the ordination of Aurelian of Limoges and the creation of thirteen churches in Gaul, the appearance of Christ to proclaim the death of Martial, the offering to Martial made by St. Valerie of his head and then his death, the funeral procession and healing the sick with his shroud. This register is closest to the ground and therefore more easily accessible; it is less well preserved than the rest. Finally, the lower register, just above the ground, is reserved for patterns sham.

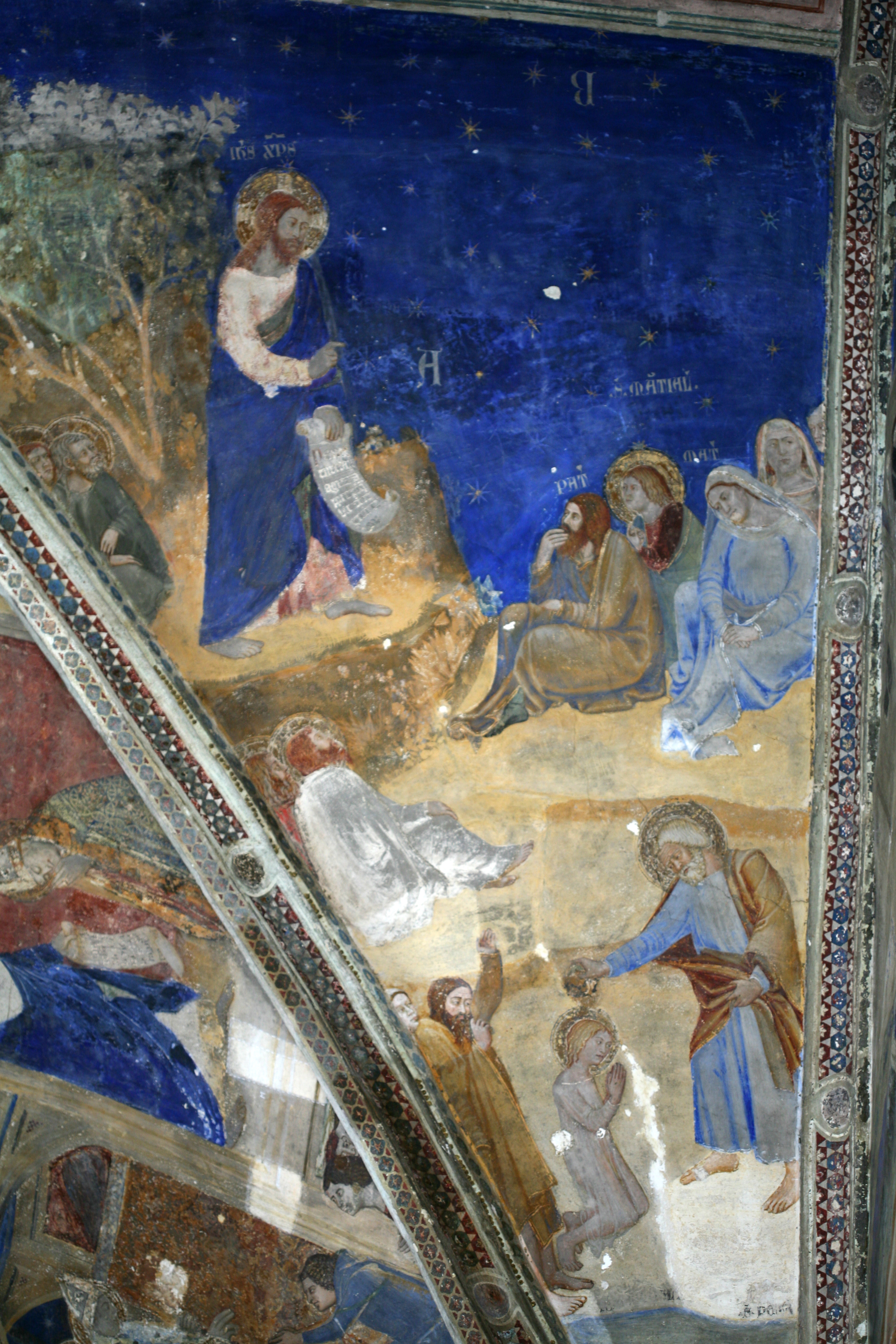
Prédication du Christ devant saint Martial – Voûtain nord

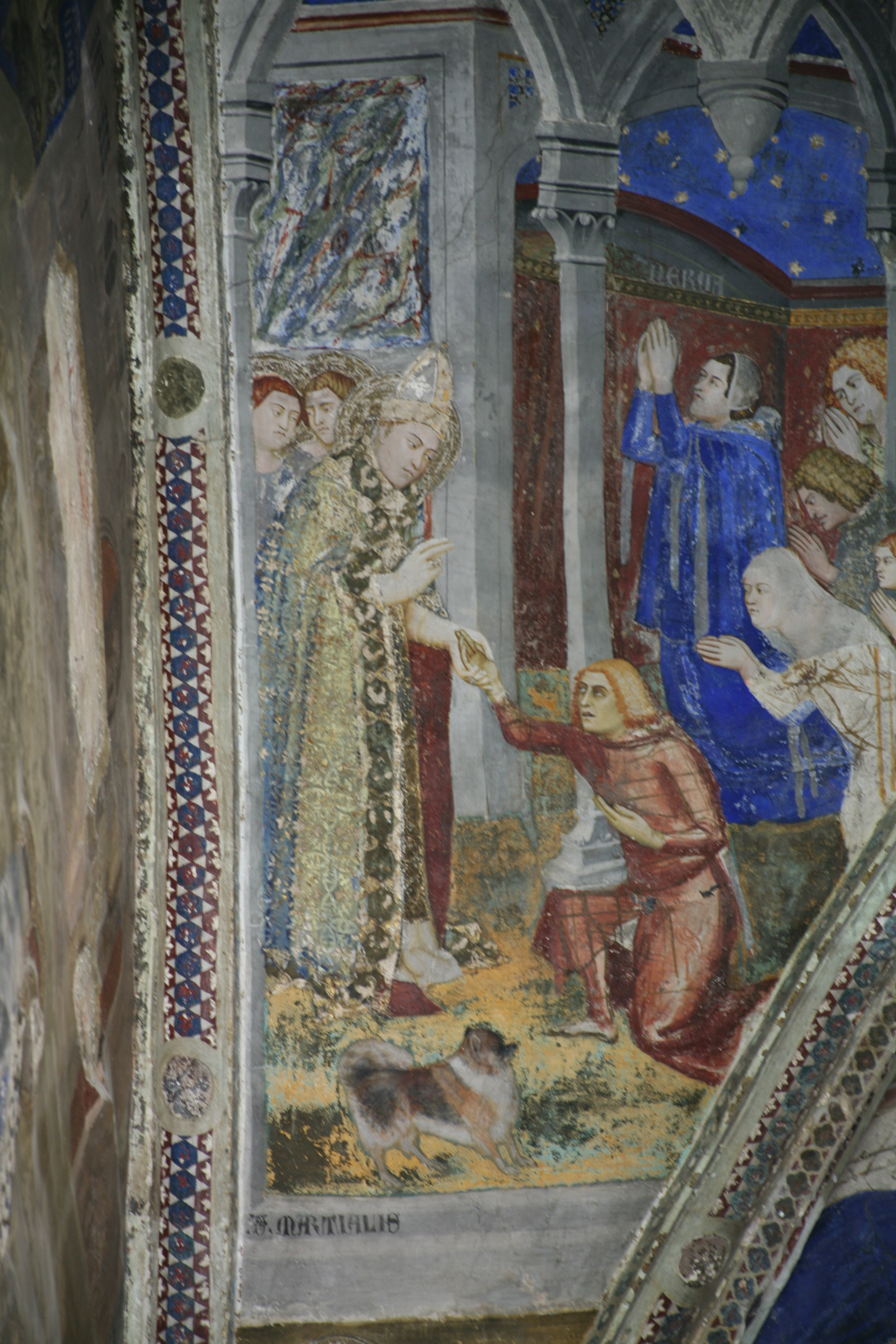
Détails Résurrection du fils de Nerva – Voûtain sud

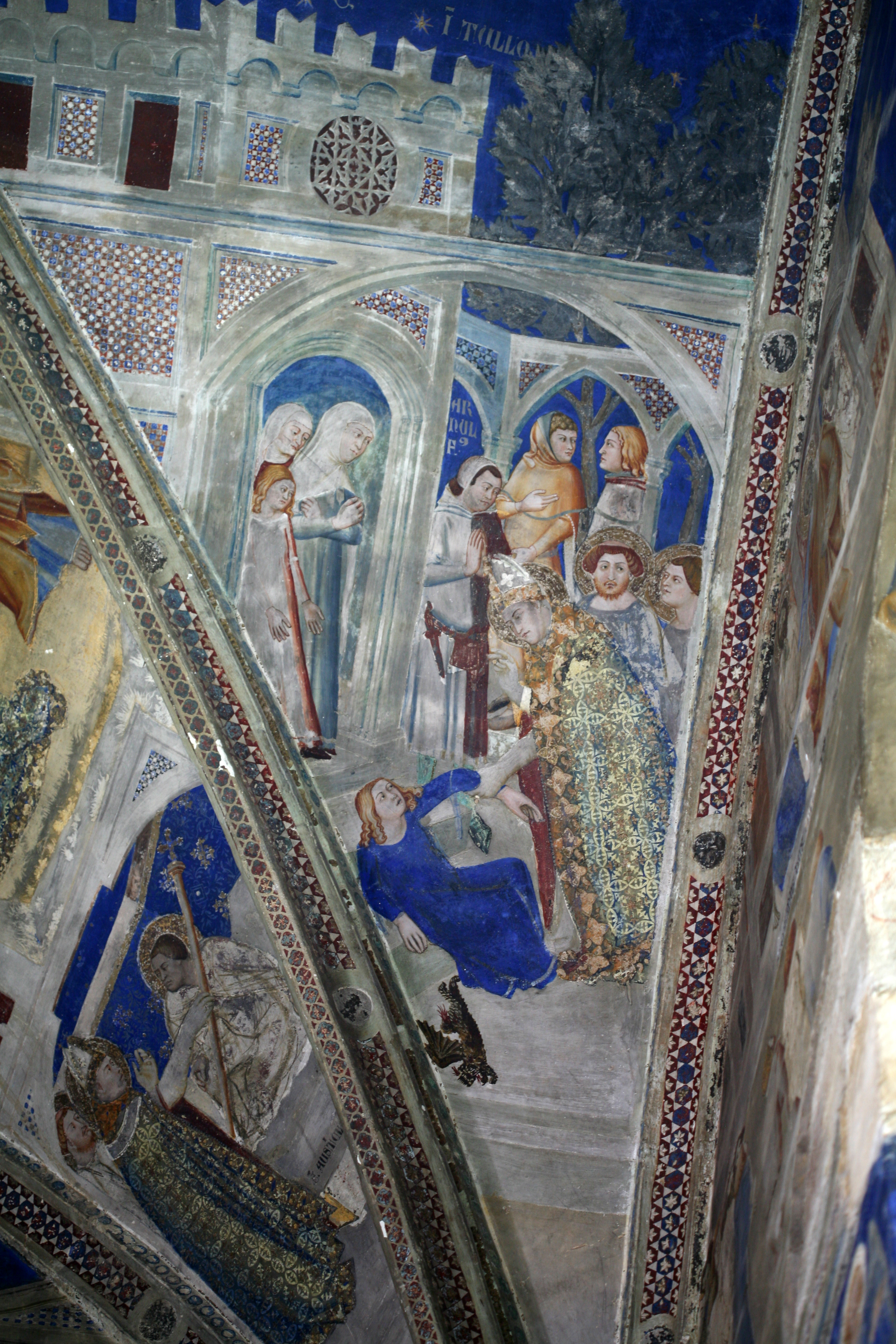
Guérison de la fille d'Arnulfus – Voûtain sud

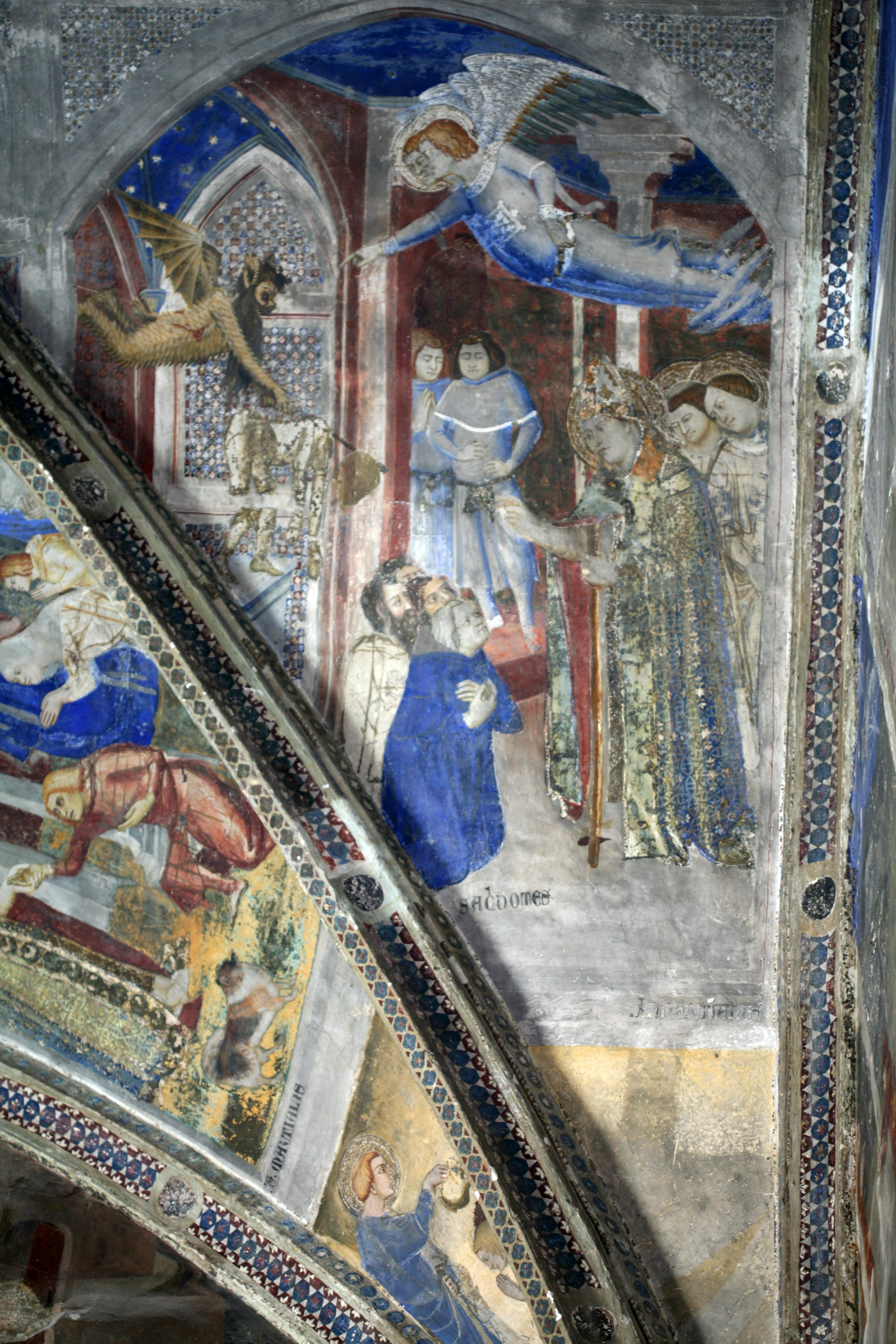
Miracle à Ahun – voûtain ouest

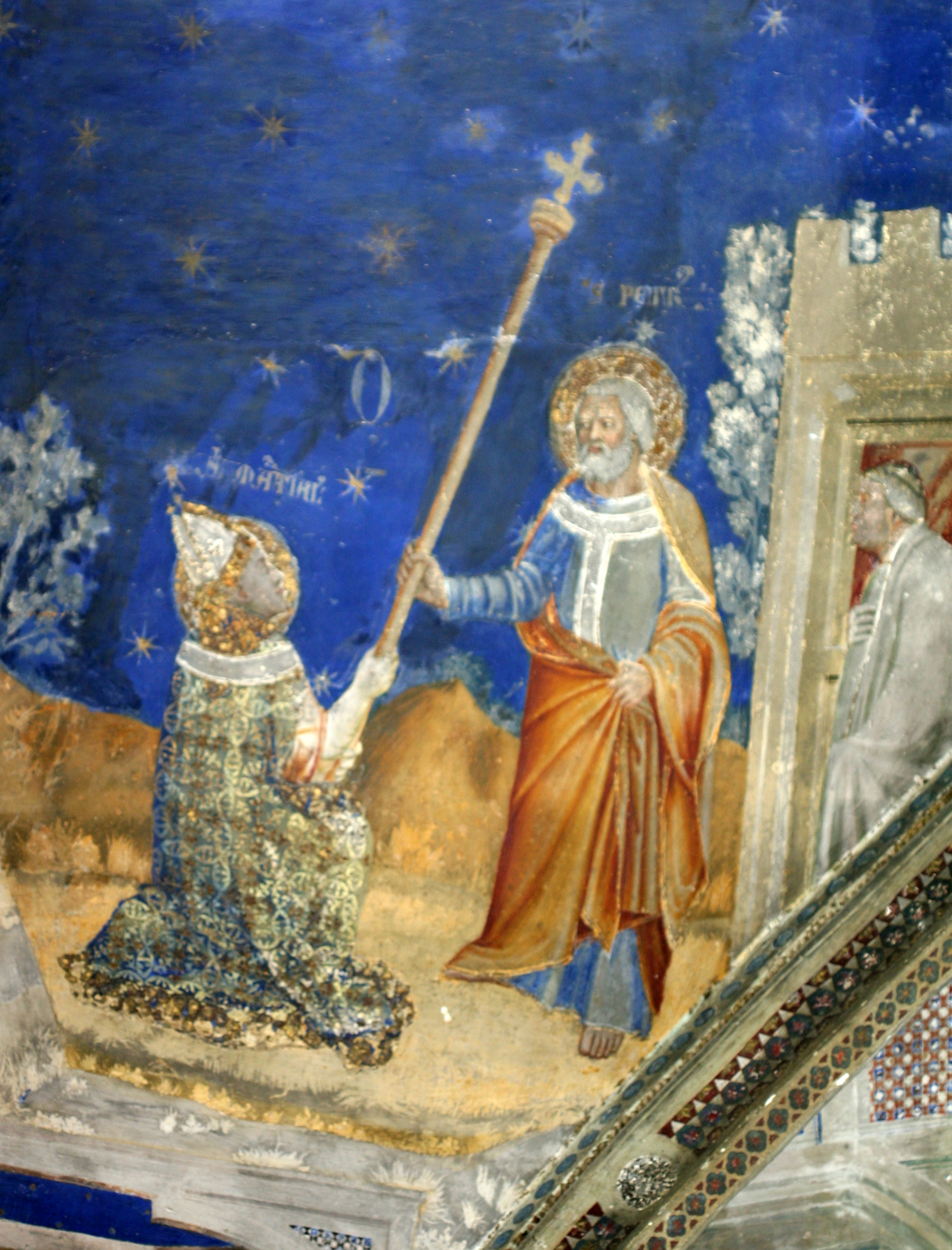
Remise du bâton de saint Pierre (détail) – Voûtain est

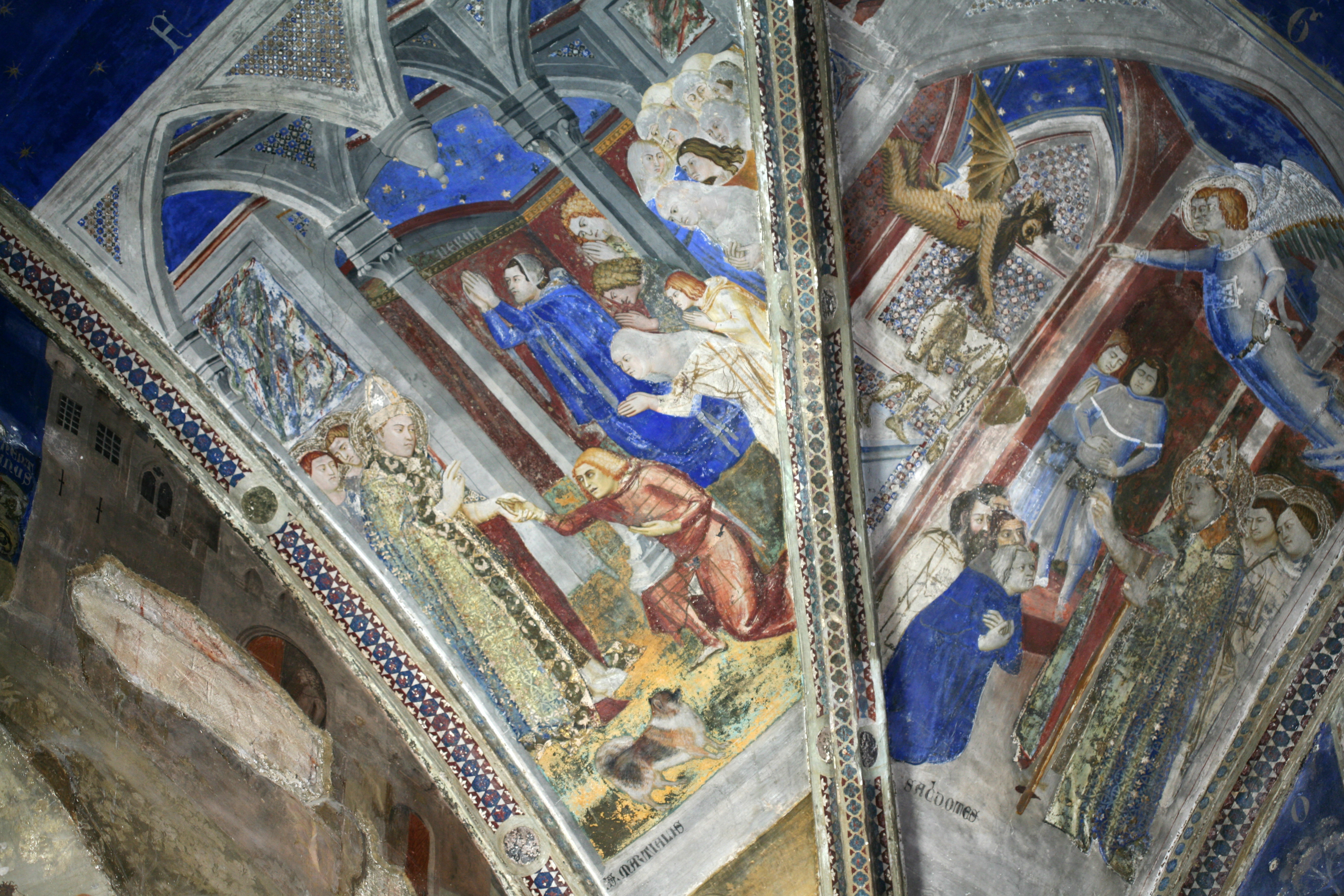
Résurrection du fils de Nerva et Miracle à Ahun – voûtains sud et ouest

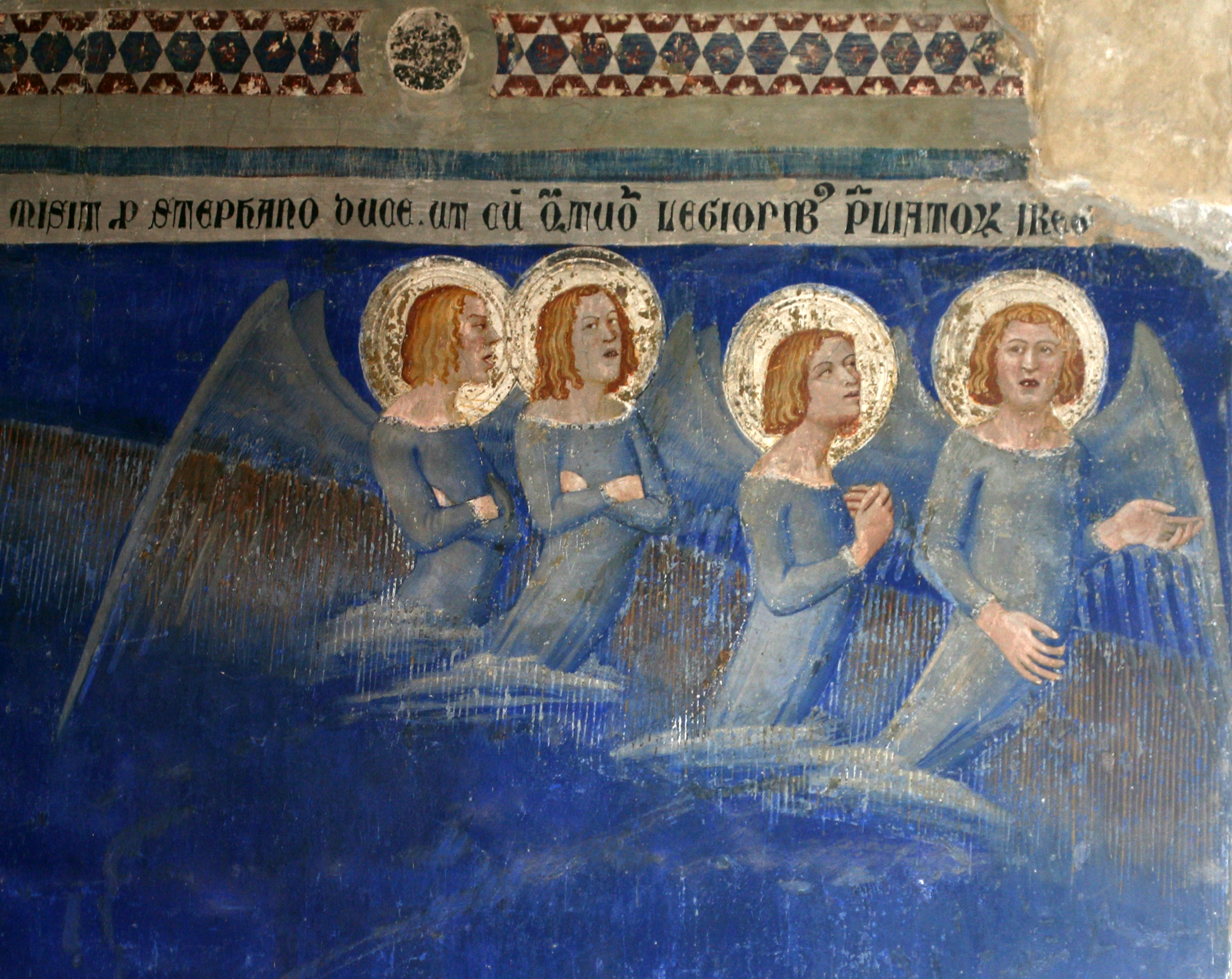
4 anges – Cortège funèbre de saint Martial – registre médian

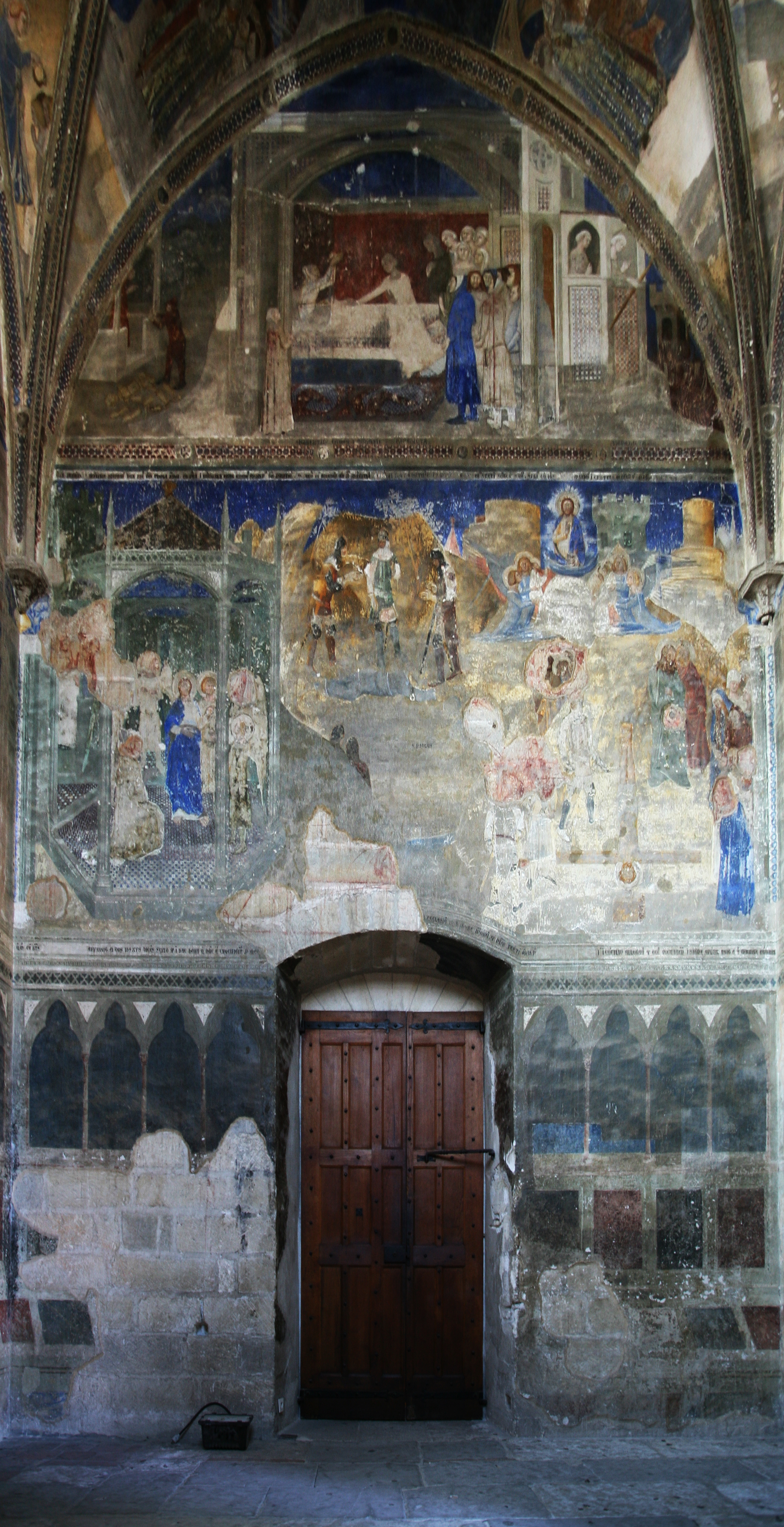
Chapelle saint Martial – mur ouest et porte

== The Saint-Jean chapel ==
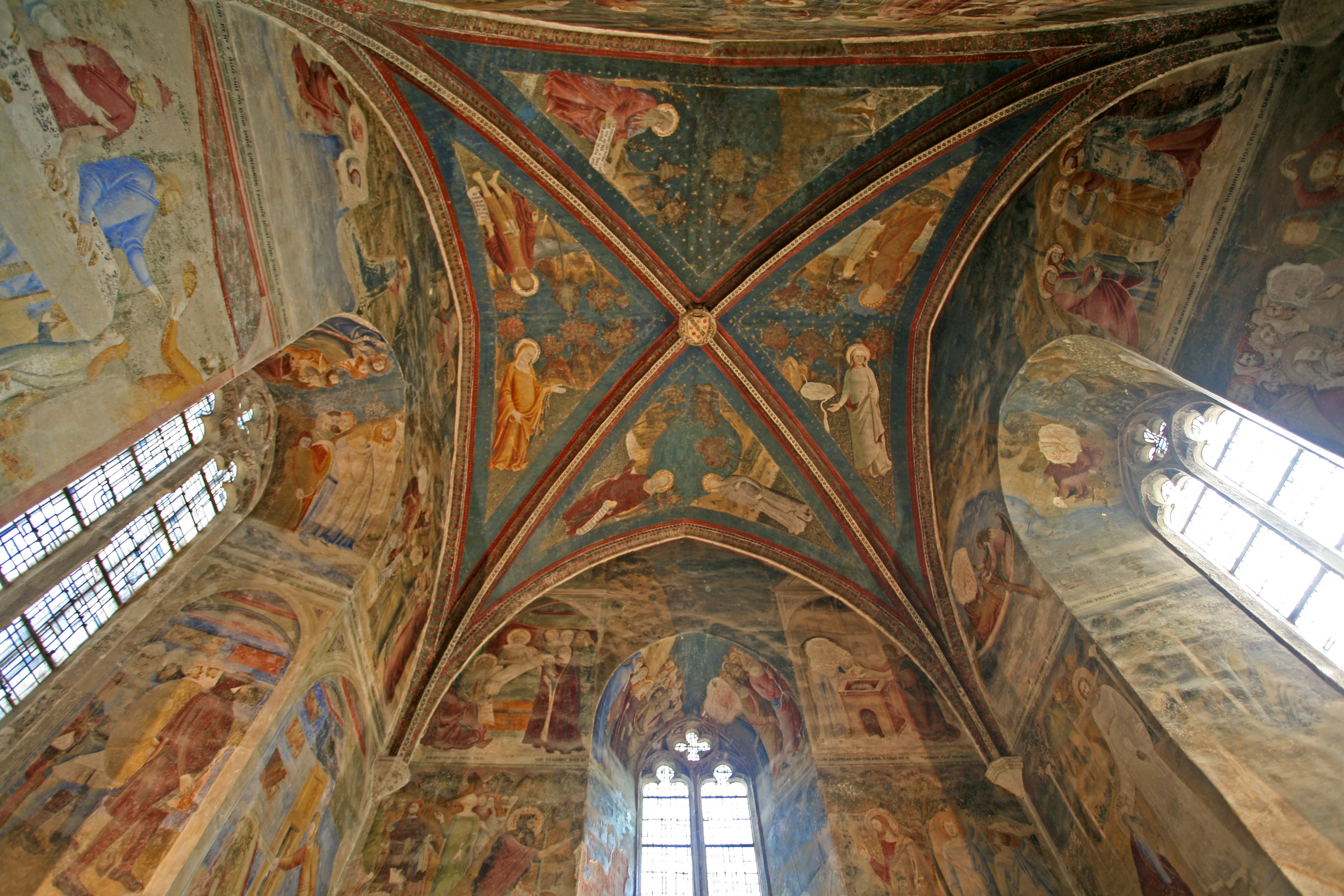
The Saint-Jean chapel

Between 1347 and 1348, Matteo Giovannetti took care of the chapel of St. John. Located under Saint-Martial, the latter, with an entrance from the north, is accessible from the hall of the Consistory, with single-storey cloister built by Pope Benedict XII. Again, the reading is done from top to bottom, but there are two parallel stories, that of John the Baptist to the south and east and that of St. John the Evangelist in the north and west. The story itself begins from the upper register, the vaults being dedicated to the presentation of parents of two saints. They include John the Baptist, his mother Saint Elizabeth, and his father St. Zachary. Also depicted is St. John the Evangelist, his mother St. Mary Salome, and his father Saint Zebedee. In all, eight characters are present in the vaults.

== Bibliography ==
- E. Castelnuovo, Un pittore italiano alla corte di Avignone. Matteo Giovannetti e la pittura in Provenza nel secolo XIV, Einaudi, 1991. (in Italian)
