= Palais des papes of Sorgues =

- Palais des papes de Sorgues
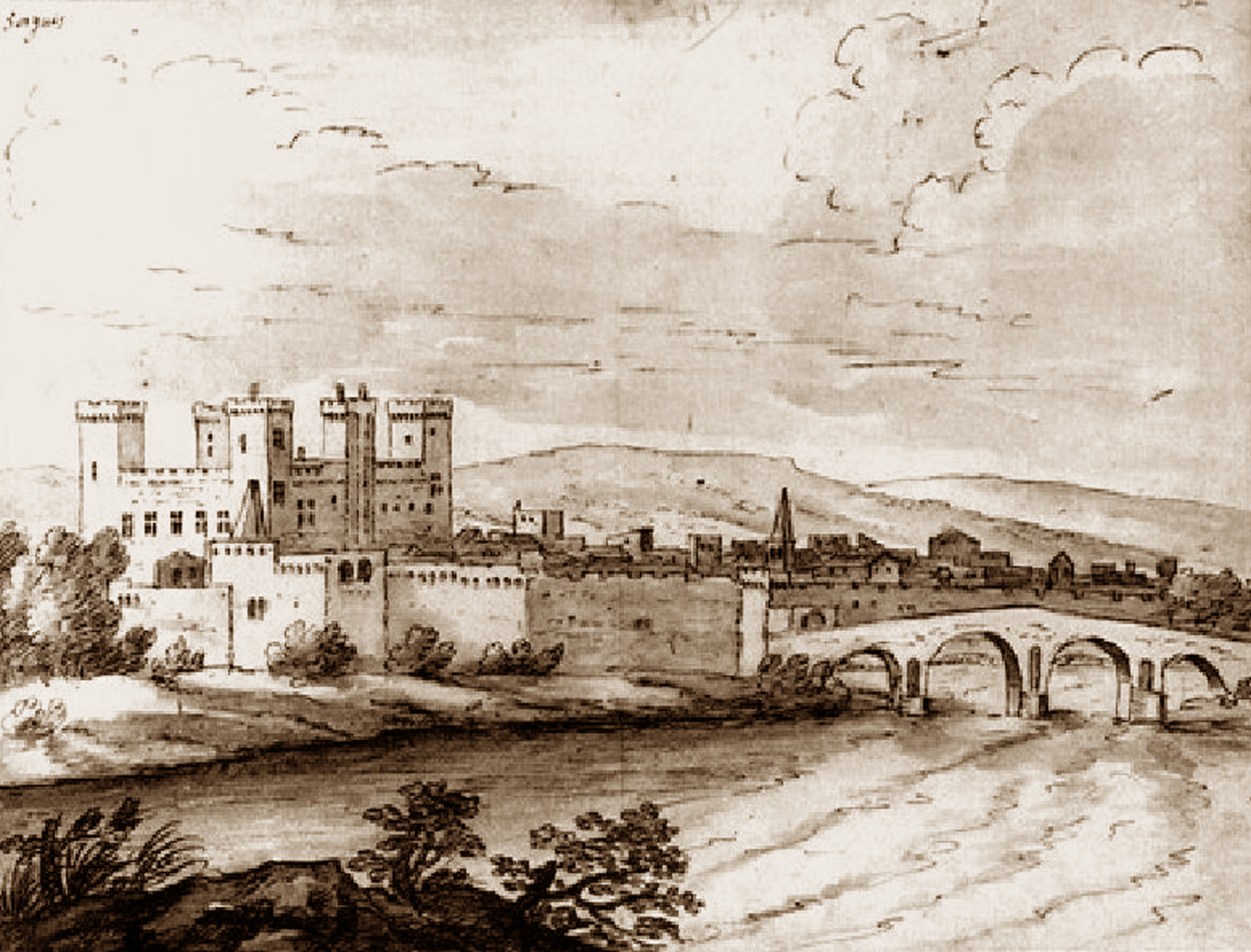
- Palais des papes of Sorgues, album Laincel, Musée Calvet

- Location within France

General information
- Status: Demolished
- Architectural style: Gothic
- Location: Sorgues, France
- Coordinates: 44°00′49″N 4°52′23″E
- Current tenants: Summer residence
- Construction started: 1317
- Completed: 1324
- Client: Avignon Papacy

Design and construction
- Architect: Pierre de Gauriac

The Palais des papes of Sorgues is the first papal residence built by the Avignon Papacy in the fourteenth century. Its construction was ordered by John XXII and preceded by 18 years the Palais des papes.

This luxurious residence had served as a model for the construction of residences of cardinals in Avignon. It remains today as ruins, because the palace was dismantled during the French Revolution by the builders that the town of Sorgues had sold.
