= Sopotsko =

Sopotsko Сопотско Sopockë
- Village
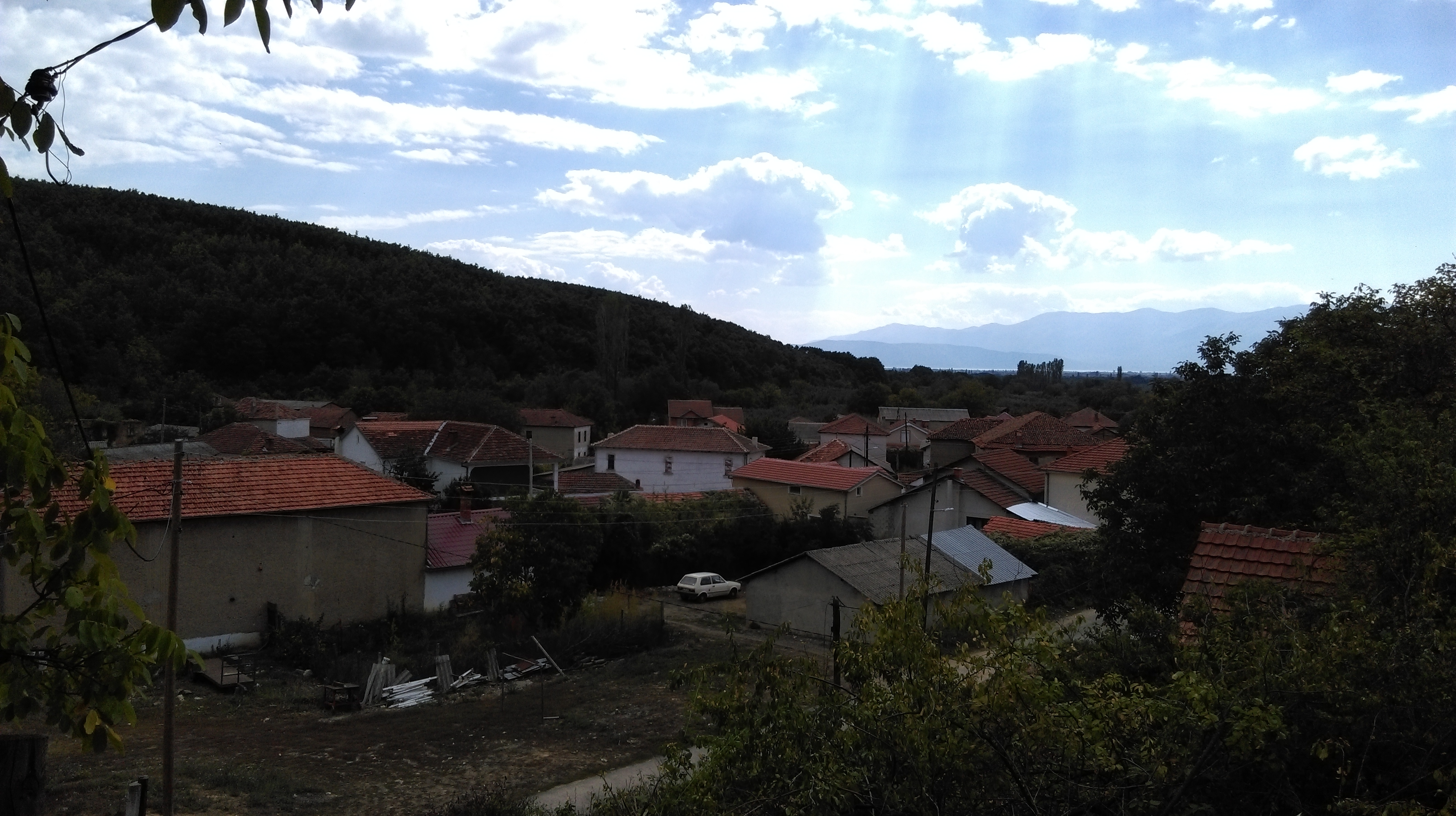
- Sopotsko

- Location within North Macedonia
- Coordinates: 41°05′06″N 21°03′50″E
- Country: North Macedonia
- Region: Pelagonia
- Municipality: Resen

Population (2002)
  - Total: 222
- Time zone: UTC+1 (CET)
  - Summer (DST): UTC+2 (CEST)
- Area code: +389
- Car plates: RE

Sopotsko (Macedonian: Сопотско, Albanian: Sopockë), is a village in the Resen Municipality of the Republic of North Macedonia. Sopotsko is roughly 5 kilometres (3.1 mi) from the municipal centre of Resen.

== Demographics ==
The village of Sopotsko is inhabited by an Orthodox Macedonian majority and a Sunni Muslim Albanian minority. Sunni Albanians in Sopotsko traditionally highlighted their religious identity over a linguistic one having closer economic and social relations with Turks and Torbeš in the region and being distant from Orthodox Macedonians. Over time these differences have disappeared through intermarriage, closer communal and cultural relations with Bektashi and other Sunni Prespa Albanian communities in the region.

As of the 2021 census, Sopotsko had 152 residents.

Ethnic group	census 1961		census 1971		census 1981		census 1991		census 1994		census 2002		census 2021	
Ethnic group	Number	%	Number	%	Number	%	Number	%	Number	%	Number	%	Number	%
Macedonians	541	84.1	444	83.3	419	73.5	285	85.3	215	87.4	184	82.9	111	73.0
Albanians	56	8.7	86	16.1	125	21.9	45	13.5	30	12.2	36	16.2	31	20.4
Turks	44	6.8	0	0.0	5	0.9	0	0.0	0	0.0	0	0.0	0	0.0
Serbs	2	0.3	1	0.2	2	0.4	1	0.3	1	0.4	0	0.0	0	0.0
others	0	0.0	2	0.4	19	3.3	3	0.9	0	0.0	2	0.9	0	0.0
Persons for whom data are taken from administrative sources													10	6.6
Total	643		533		570		334		260		222		152	

== People from Sopotsko ==
- Naum Pecalev - Bekrijata (1874 - ?), rebel
- Reis Shaqiri (1922 - 2006), partisan
- Resul Shaqiri (1931 -), communist politician
