= Walls of Avignon =

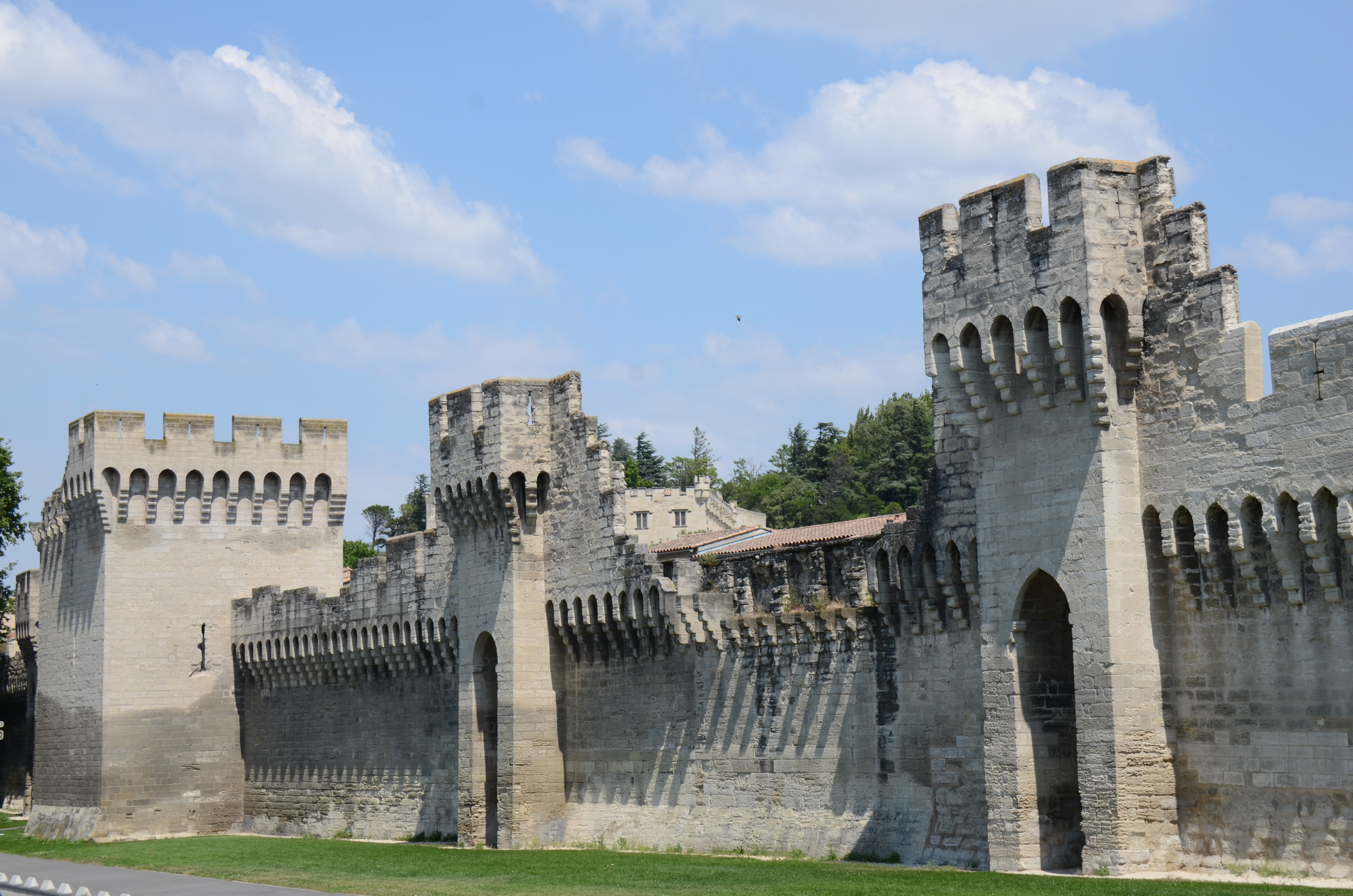
- Walls between the Porte de L'Oulle and the Porte du Rhône

- Location in France
- 43°56′53″N 4°48′25″E
- Location: Avignon, Vaucluse, France

History
- Built: 14th century

Site notes
- Owner: Centre des monuments nationaux

Monument historique
- Official name: Remparts et leurs abords
- Designated: 1906, 1914, 1915, 1933, 1937
- Reference no.: PA00081943

The walls of Avignon (French: Les Remparts d'Avignon) are a series of defensive stone walls that surround the city of Avignon in the south of France. They were built in the 14th century during the Avignon papacy and have been continually rebuilt and repaired throughout their subsequent history.

The current walls replaced an earlier double set of defensive walls that had been completed in the first two decades of the 13th century. During the Albigensian Crusade the town sided with the Count of Toulouse, Raymond VII but in 1226, after a three-month siege by Louis VIII of France, Avignon capitulated and was forced to dismantle the earlier walls and fill in the moats. Beginning in around 1231, the earlier walls were rebuilt and although they have not survived, their path is preserved in the street plan of the city.

In 1309 Pope Clement V moved to Avignon and under the papacy the town expanded outside the limits of the earlier city walls. From the 1350s during the Hundred Years' War the town became vulnerable to pillage by marauding bands of mercenaries and in 1357 under Innocent VI, the fifth Avignon pope, work began on the construction of a new set of city walls to enclose the expanded town. The walls took nearly 20 years to complete.

The walls stretch for 4.3 km (2.7 mi) and enclose an area of 150 ha (370 acres). There were originally twelve gates controlling access to the city but this number was reduced to seven when the fortifications were modified between 1481 and 1487 during the French Wars of Religion. There are now 15 vehicular entrances and 11 pedestrian entrances.

== Early fortifications ==
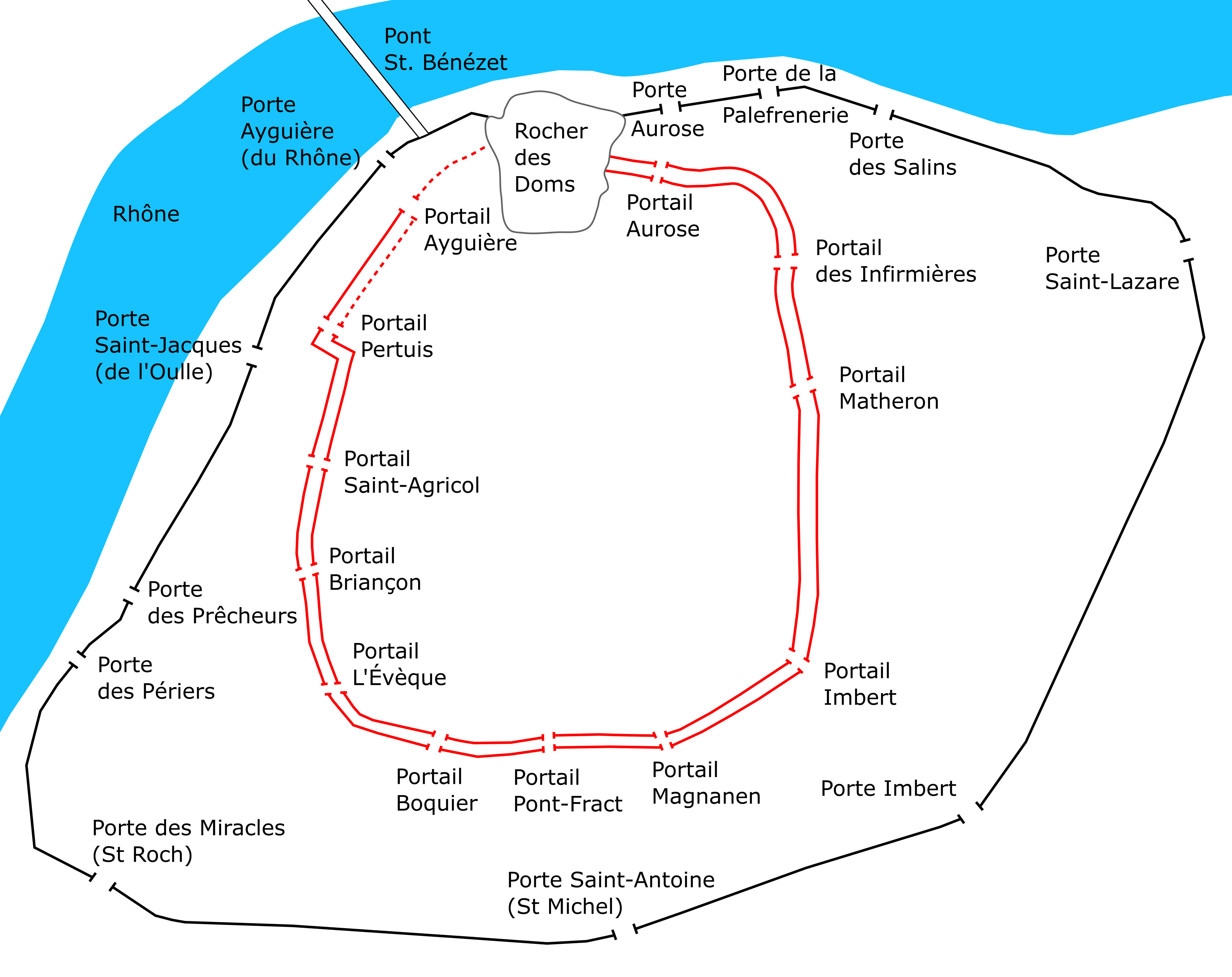
City walls in the 13th and 14th centuries. The 13th century double walls are shown in red.

Historians had assumed that during the Roman period Avignon would have been defended by a wall, but this is now considered unlikely. A large amount of rescue archaeology has taken place in Avignon since the 1960s, especially around the Place de l'Horloge. This has revealed many details of the Roman town but no evidence has been found for a defensive wall.

In late antiquity a rudimentary wall was erected by reusing material from Roman monuments. It was centred on the Rocher des Doms and enclosed a much smaller area than the Roman town. This wall is mentioned by the Gallo-Roman historian Gregory of Tours when describing the siege of the town by the Frankish king, Clovis I, in around 500 AD.

== 13th century double walls ==
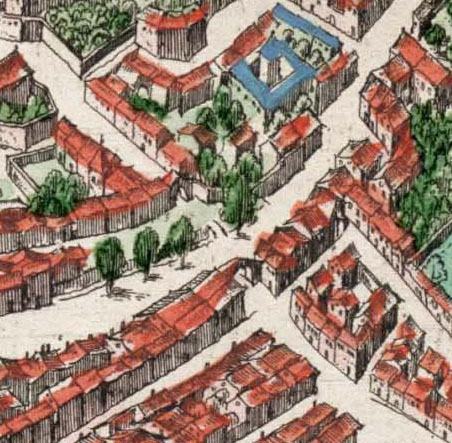
A 17th century map showing the two arches of the Portail Magnanen at the junction of the Rue du Portail Magnanen and the Rue des Lices. A bridge is shown over the inner moat.

In the 12th century the town enjoyed a degree of independence and became very prosperous. A bridge was built across the Rhône, the Pont Saint-Bénézet whose construction is traditionally dated to between 1177 and 1185. There are no surviving records of when the first city wall was built but historians have suggested dates between 1060 and 1176.

In the first two decades of the 13th century the town added a second wall with a second moat outside the earlier wall. The two walls were parallel and separated by around 30 m (33 yd). Built into the outer wall were a series semi-circular towers. Access to the town was provided by twelve pairs of gates, each pair consisting of a gate in the inner wall and another in the outer. (Note: For four of the twelve entrances the surviving manuscripts only ever mention a single gate. These are: Portail Pertuis, Portail Saint-Agricol, Portail l'Évêque, and Portail Aurose.) Water for the moats came from the Sorgue through the Canal de Vaucluse. After 1229, additional water was also provided from the Durance by the Canal de l'Hôpital (La Durançole). The double walls extended around a perimeter of approximately 3 km (1.9 mi) and enclosed an area of around 45 ha (110 acres).

During the Albigensian Crusade the town sided with the Count of Toulouse, Raymond VII. In 1226 the French king, Louis VIII, descended the Rhône valley with a papal legate and a large army en route to a new campaign against the Albigensians. Avignon refused to open its gates but after a siege lasting three months (10 June until 12 September) the city was forced by famine to capitulate. One of the conditions imposed on the town was the dismantling of the city walls. The town rebuilt the defences between 1234 and 1237, presumably on the same plan, but in 1251 Avignon lost its independence when the two younger brothers of King Louis IX, Alphonse of Poitiers and Charles of Anjou (Charles I of Naples) took back control and appointed a viguier (magistrate) to administer the town.

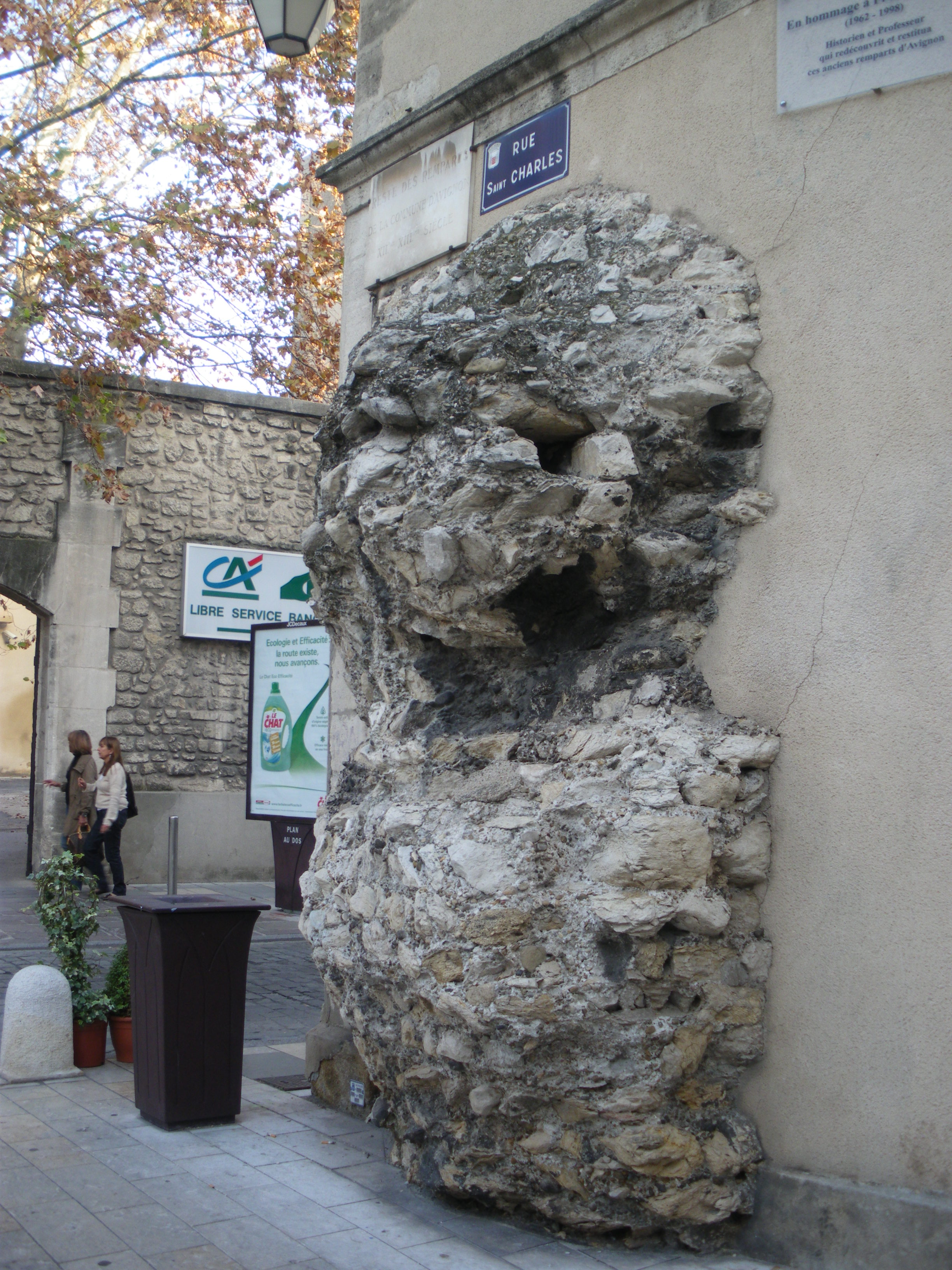
Surviving fragment of the 13th century double walls at the junction of Rue Joseph Vernet with Rue Saint Charles

The only surviving piece of the 13th century fortifications is a small fragment of the outer wall at the junction of rue Joseph-Vernet with rue Saint-Charles. Much of the path of the double defence is preserved in the city plan as modern streets follow what was once the gap between the two city walls. Working clockwise from the northeast the walls followed the rue des Trois-Colombes, the rue Campane, the rue Paul-Saïn, the rue Philonarde, the rue des Lices, the rue Henri-Farbe, the rue Joseph-Vernet and the rue Grande-Fusterie. The path of early walls in northwest corner of the town near the Pont Saint-Bénézet is obscure due to the subsequent changes to the fortifications in this important area.

The pairs of arched gateways were retained long after the double set of walls had been demolished and are depicted on 16th and 17th century maps of the town. Many of the old gates were removed in the 18th century but the Portail de Pertuis was not demolished until 1847. The appearance of these gates is unknown as they are not depicted on any print or lithograph. The names of some gates have survived in the modern street names: rue Portail Biensen, rue du Portail Magnanen, rue Portail Matheron and Planet du Portail Peint. (Note: Portail Peint was another name for the old Portail Imbert.)

Water from the Sorgue joined the outer moat near the Portail Imbert, flowed around the walls to the Portail l'Êveque and then flowed away to join the Rhône. With the development of the town the moat was vaulted over although the river remained visible along the rue des Teinturiers. In the covered section of the moat, which now serves as a main sewer, the external surfaces of the 13th century walls are clearly visible as are the lower portions the semi-circular towers. The towers average 6.2 m (20 ft) in diameter and are spaced about 34 m (37 yd) apart. The façades of the buildings on the south side of the rue des Lice, rue Henri Fabre and rue Joseph Vernet are aligned with the remains of the outer city wall below ground.

== Avignon papacy and the 14th century city walls ==
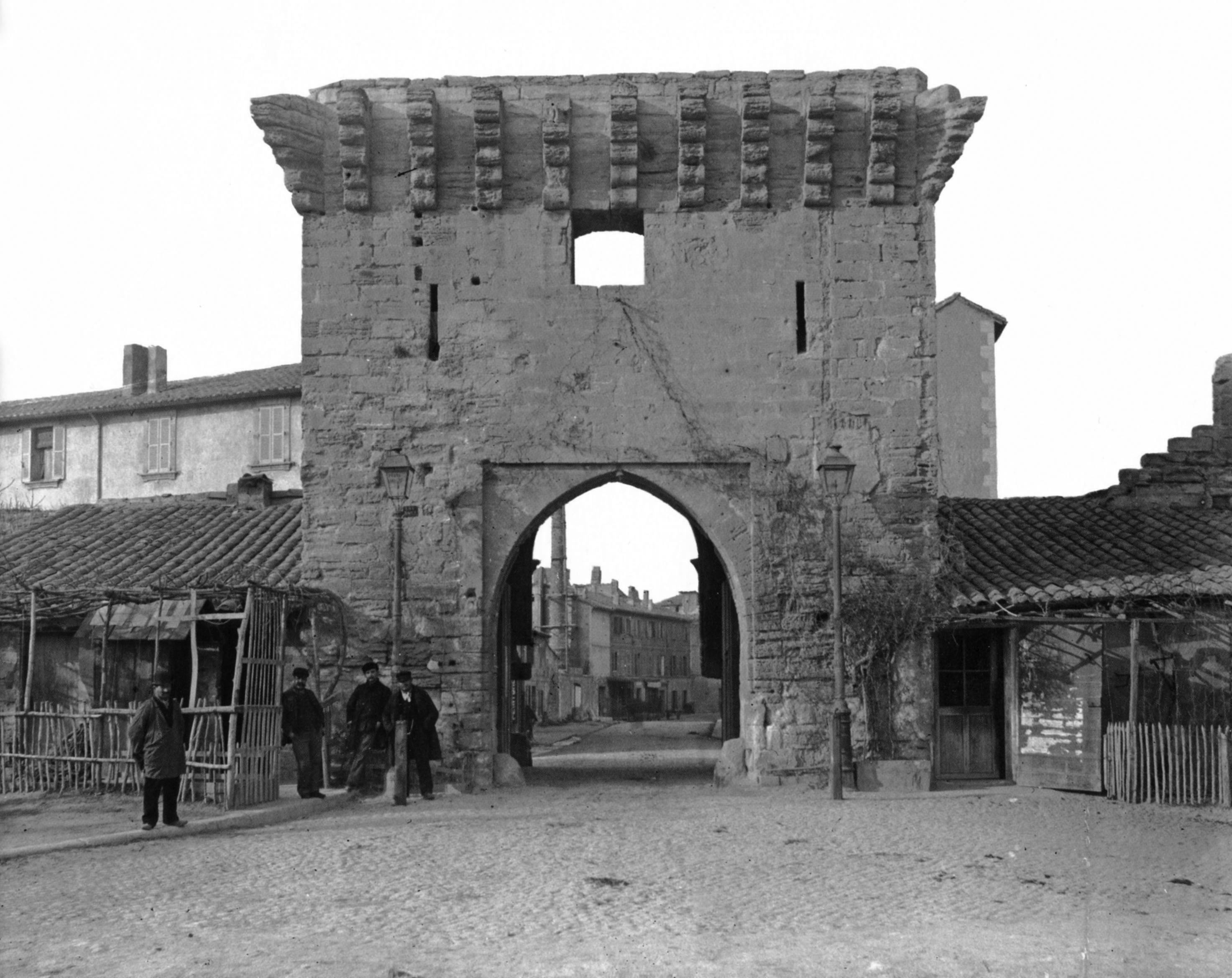
Porte Limbert before its demolition in 1896. The structure dated at least from the 15th century and possibly the 14th century.

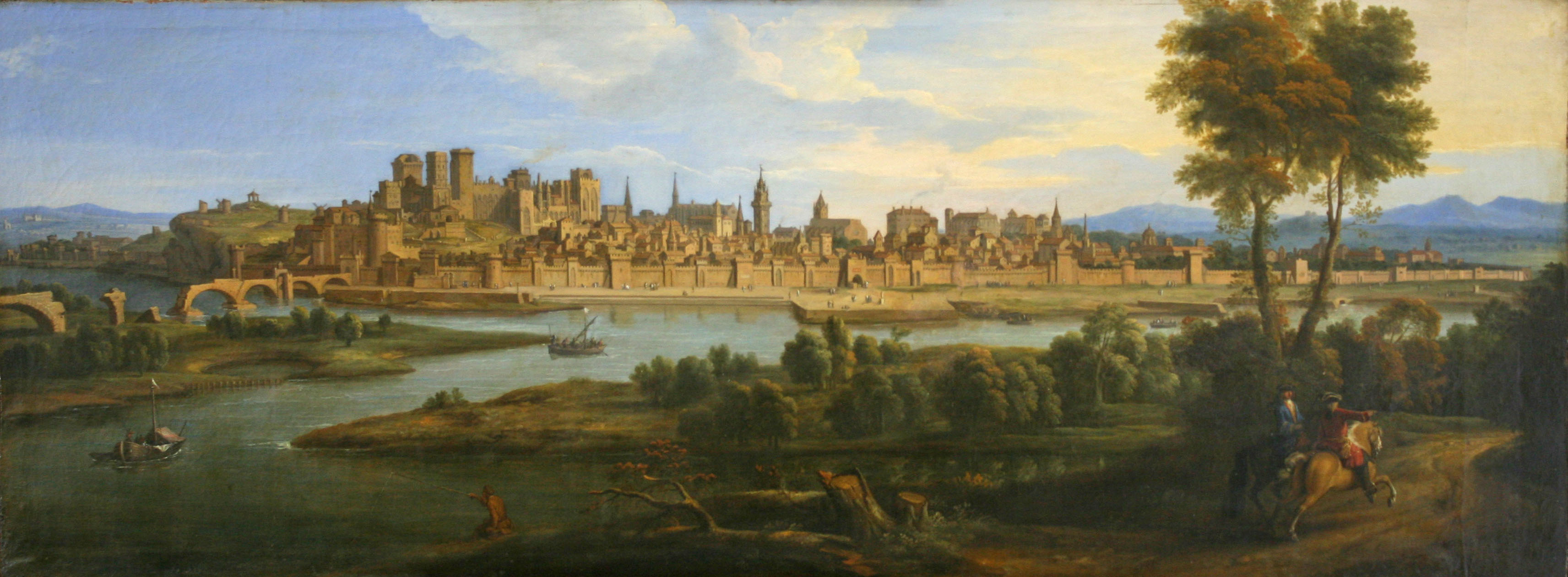
Avignon viewed from the right bank of the Rhône in around 1700 by Robert Bonnart (1652–1733)

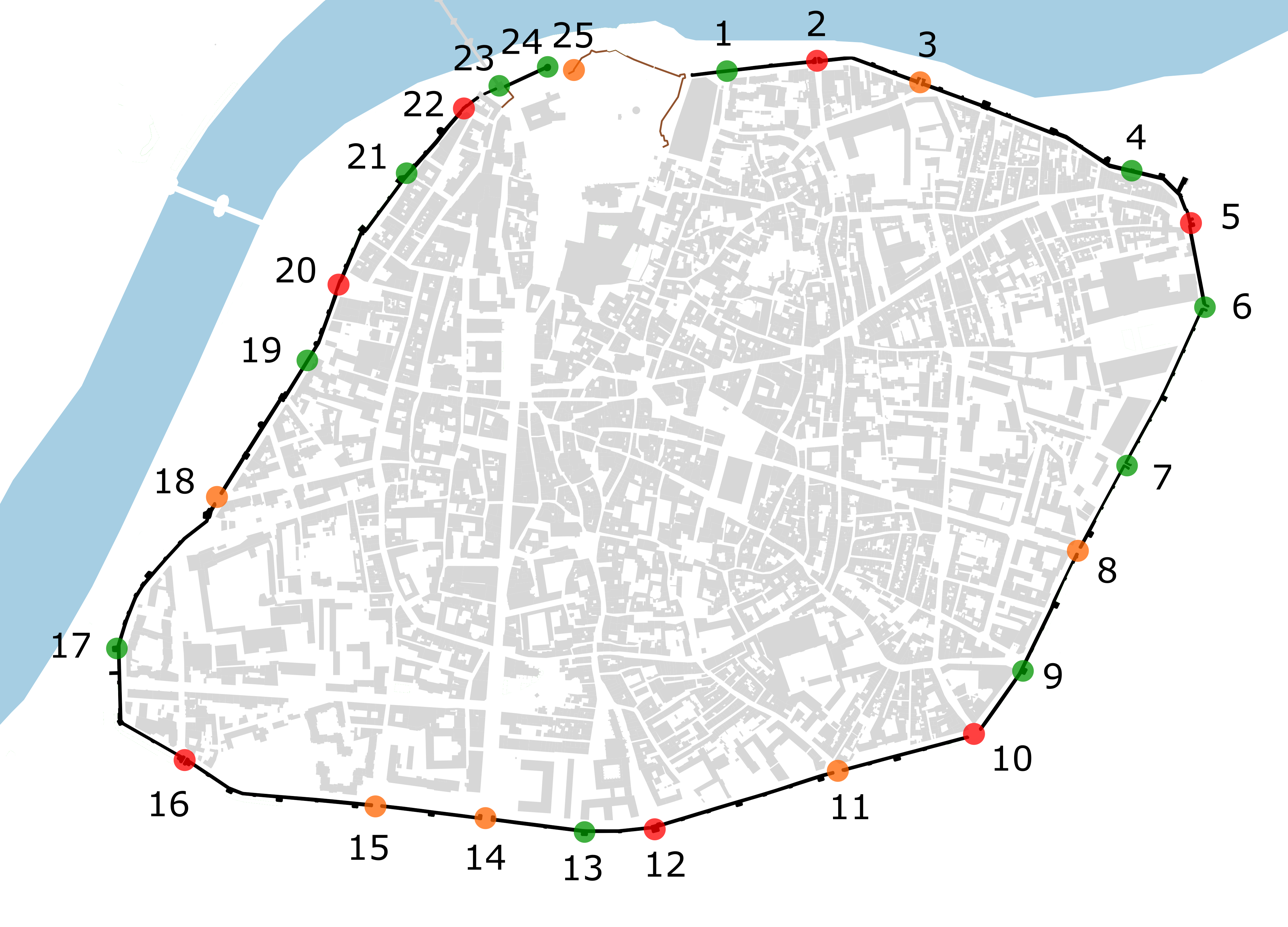
Modern entrances. Those dating from the end of the 15th century are indicated by red disks, other vehicular entrances by orange disks and pedestrian entrances are indicated by green disks.: 1. Poterne Banasterie 2. Porte de la Ligne; 3. Porte Saint-Joseph 4. Poterne Saint-Lazare; 5. Porte Saint-Lazare 6. Porte de l'Université; 7. Poterne Chabran 8. Porte Thiers; 9. Poterne des Teinturiers 10. Porte Limbert; 11. Portail Magnanen 12. Porte Saint-Michel; 13. Poterne Monclar 14. Porte de la République; 15. Porte Saint-Charles 16. Porte Saint-Roch; 17. Poterne Raspail 18. Porte Saint-Dominique; 19. Poterne de l'Oratoire 20. Porte de l'Oulle; 21. Poterne Georges Pompidou 22. Porte du Rhône; 23. Le Châtelet 24. Tour Polygonale; 25. Porte du Rocher

Pope Clement V moved the papacy from Rome to Avignon in 1309. This led to a large expansion of the town so that the free space within the double walls was soon exhausted and church officials began building outside the old walls, joining the mendicant orders that had established monasteries outside the city gates in the previous century. The residents of these new suburbs lacked the protection provided by the walls but were exempt from paying the city taxes.

In 1348 Pope Clement VI purchased the town of Avignon from Joanna I of Naples, the Queen of Naples and Countess of Provence, for 80,000 gold florins. Prompted by the threat from the bands of marauding mercenaries (free companies) that were roaming elsewhere in France, sometime between 1355 and 1357 Pope Innocent VI decided to protect the expanded town with a new set of walls. The walls were to enclose a large lozenge shaped area that included the Chapelle Notre-Dame-des-Miracles in the southwest that had been founded by the second Avignon pope John XXII and the Hôpital Sainte-Marthe to the east that had recently been founded by the legal expert Bernard Rascas and his wife. (Note: The site of the hospital is now occupied by Avignon University.) The area of the town would increase by more than three-fold to 151.7 ha (375 acres). The pope may have initially provided small sums for the project but from January 1358 the construction costs were paid for by a tax (gabelle) on wine brought into the town. Additional taxes were introduced on salt and general merchandise in 1363. The papacy also lent money to the town to allow the work to proceed more rapidly.

While work on the wall was progressing the town came under attack from unemployed mercenaries whose numbers increased when a truce in the Hundred Years' War was agreed in Bordeaux between the English and French forces in March 1357. In 1358 Pope Innocent VI bought off a group of mercenaries led by Arnaud de Cervole (known as the Archpriest) with a ransom of 1,000 gold florins.

The new suburbs were protected with temporary wooden structures while the stone walls were being built. Limestone for the walls and towers came from a quarry on the other side of the Rhône above Villeneuve-lès-Avignon, wood came from Savoy, lime for the mortar came from Villeneuve-lès-Avignon and sand came from islands in the Rhône. By 1372 the new walls were sufficiently advanced to protect the town against a band of mercenaries en route to Italy. Work continued and in 1381 the merlons near the Dominican monastery (Porte des Prêcheurs) were rebuilt.

The walls extended for a length of 4.33 km (2.69 mi) and included 12 gates, 36 large towers and around 50 small towers with blind arches. No wall was required for a stretch of 270 metres (300 yd) at the north of the town which was protected by the steep sides of the Rocher des Doms. Except for a section near the Rhône between the Porte Saint-Jacques and the Rocher des Doms the walls were surrounded by a moat which was supplied with water from the Sorgue and the Durance. Each of the gates included a drawbridge, a portcullis and a pair of heavy wooden doors. The walls were crowned with a battlement which protected a walkway (chemin de ronde). The towers had tiled roofs and may have originally been fitted with wooded hoarding which were later replaced with stone.

== 15th century modifications ==
During the Western Schism (1378 to 1417) that followed the Avignon papacy, Aragonese troops paid by the antipope Benedict XIII defended the papal palace complex against attacks by people from the town. The walls near the bridge were damaged and in 1410 the tower controlling access to the bridge collapsed. It was rebuilt in 1414. Between 1479 and 1488 the walls were repaired and remodelled with the reduction in the number of gates from twelve to seven. The work was initiated by the papal legate Archbishop Giuliano della Rovere who subsequently became Pope Julius II.

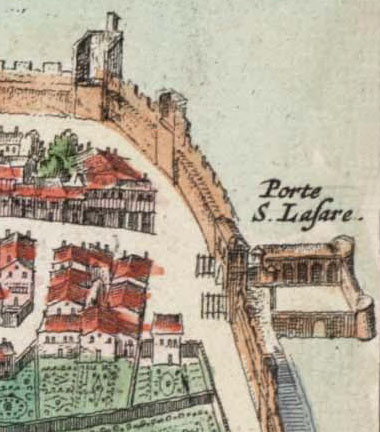
Porte Saint-Lazare with its ravelin on a 17th-century map

== 16th century and the Wars of Religion ==
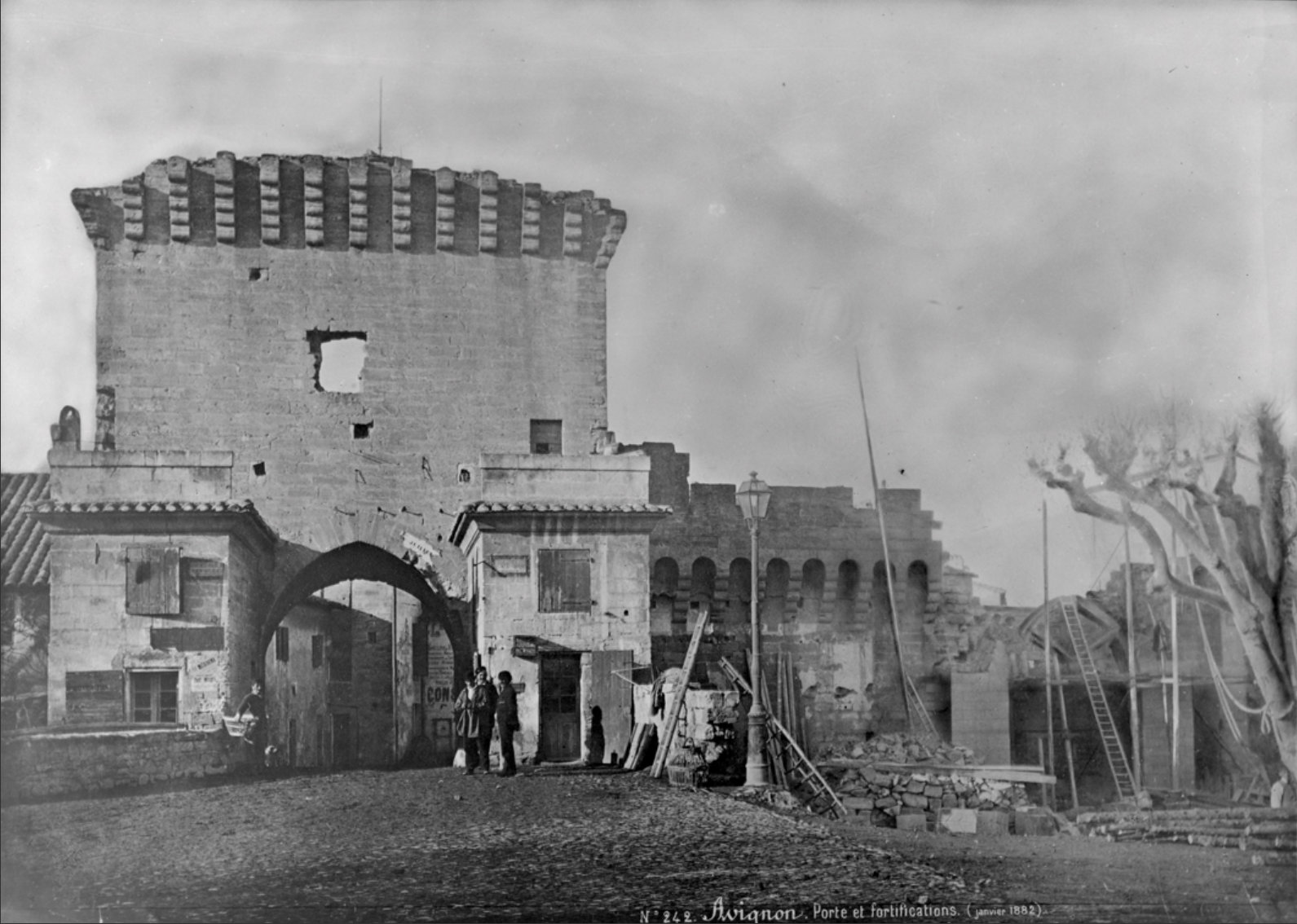
Porte Saint-Lazare in 1882 during the construction of the supplementary entrance and before the restoration. The small square towers on either side of the entrance were the remains of the ravelin. They were demolished in 1935.

In the first half of the 16th century the crumbling towers were repaired and between 1524 and 1538 extra loopholes were pierced for the newly acquired cannons. In 1561 Pope Pius IV sent his cousin, Fabrizio Serbelloni, to organise the defence of the town against the Huguenots during the French Wars of Religion (1562–1598). The walls were repaired, and three of the gates were walled up. These were Porte Saint-Roch, Porte de l'Oulle and Porte de la Ligne. The remaining four gates were strengthened by the addition of protective fortifications (ravelins) outside the gates themselves.

From the second half of the 17th century some of the defensive structures were dismantled. Beginning in 1661 the three gates that had been walled up during the Wars of Religion were reopened, and a few years later all the drawbridges were removed. In 1679 some of the exterior fortifications protecting the Porte Saint Michel were transformed into a triumphal arch dedicated to Pope Innocent XI (in post 1676–1689).

== 18th century and the Revolution ==
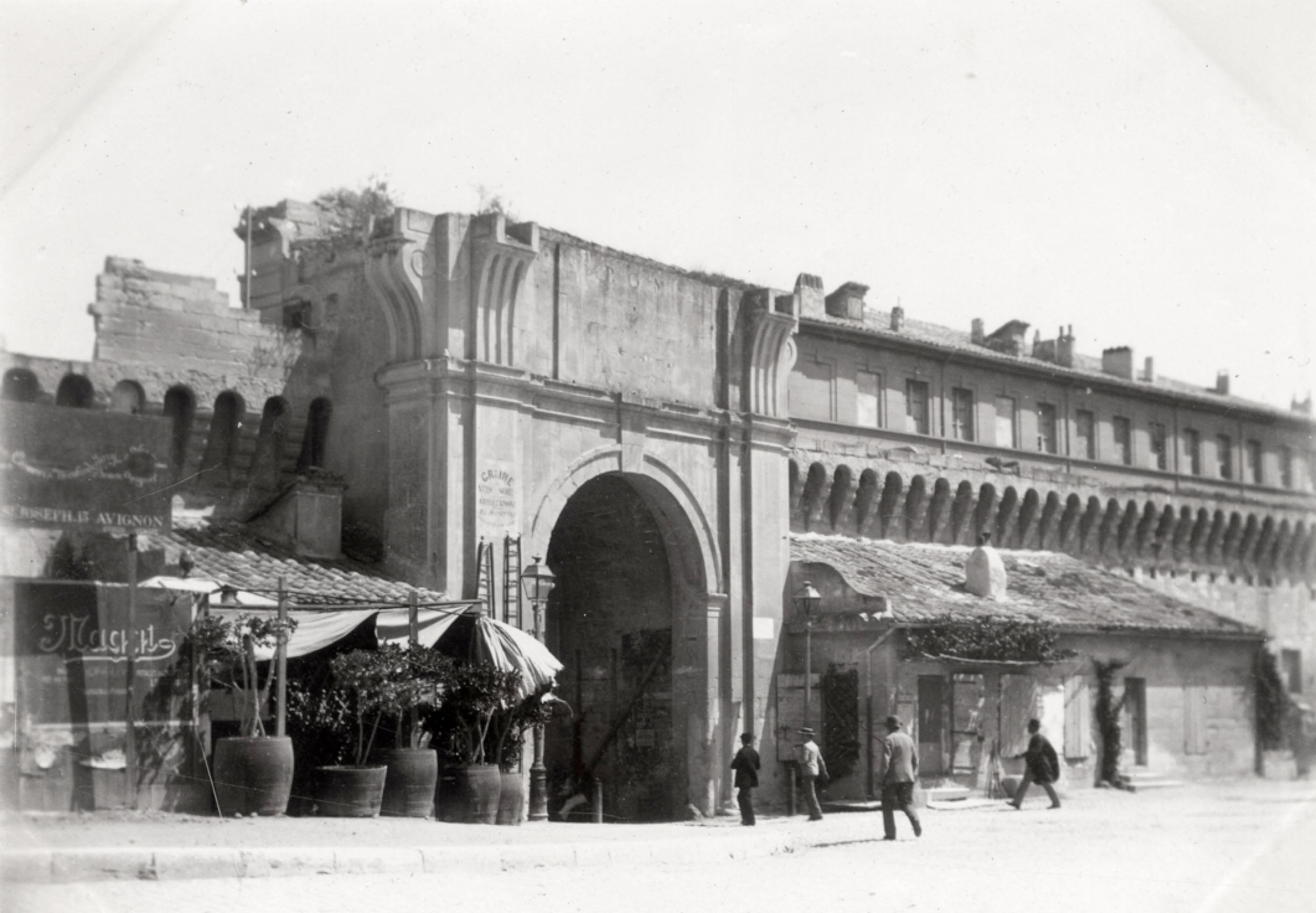
Porte de l'Oulle was rebuilt in 1783 but demolished in 1900. The low building to the right of the gate is an office for the octroi (toll) collector.

In the 18th century the walls continued to be maintained up to the time of the French Revolution and three of the seven gates were rebuilt. The Porte de la Ligne at the north of the town was judged to be too narrow. In 1755–1757 a new gatehouse designed by the architect Jean-Pierre Franque was built 50 metres west of the old gate at the end of Rue Palapharnerie. The new gate replaced a small tower. The old gatehouse was demolished and replaced by another small tower. In 1760 the Porte du Rhône, to the south of the Saint-Bénézet bridge, was demolished and rebuilt in a classical style. The new gate was again designed by Franque. In 1783 the Porte de l'Oulle, to the west side of the town, was demolished and rebuilt 20 metres to the north of its original position, opposite La Comédie theatre on the other side of the Place Crillon. Vestiges of the arch of the original gate are still visible on the interior surface of the wall. The design was by the architect Jean-Baptiste Péru. The new gate no longer survives: it was demolished in 1900. During this period the battlements were repaired between Porte Saint Roch and Porte d'Oulle as well as between Porte de la Ligne and Porte Saint-Lazare.

All work on the walls ceased during the French Revolution (1789-1799) and on 24 September 1791 Avignon and the Comtat Venaissin were declared part of France and ceased to be Papal States.

== 19th century ==
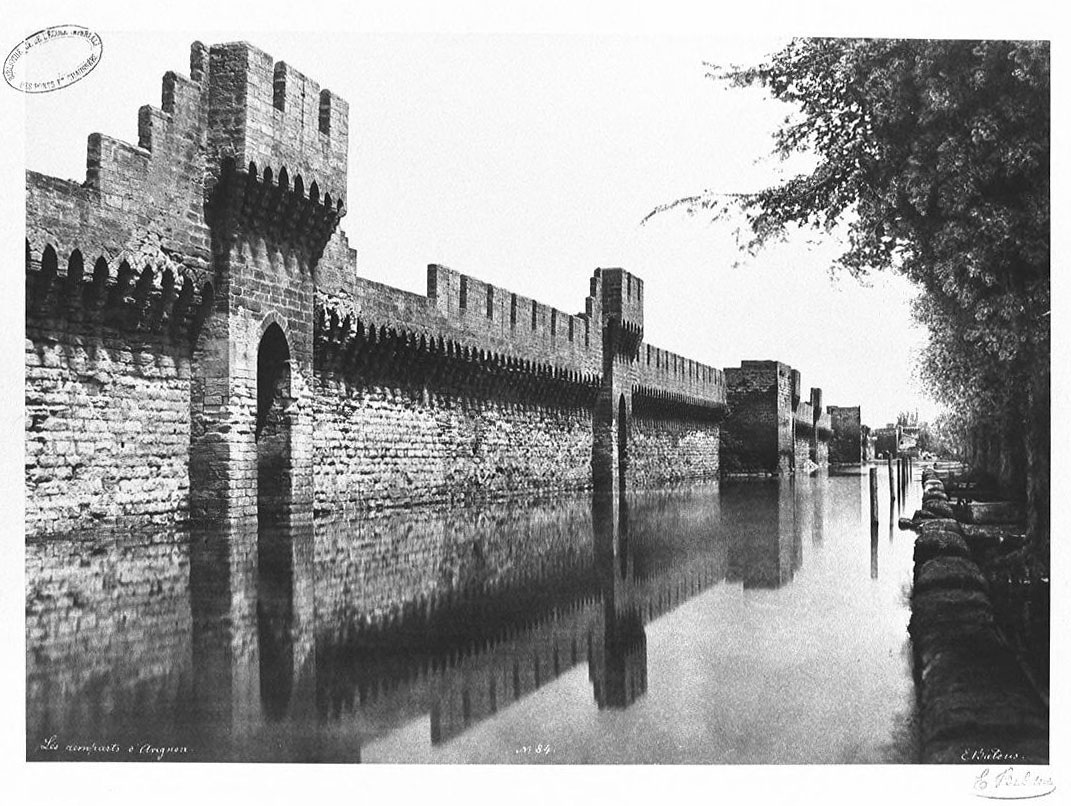
Photograph by Édouard Baldus showing the flooding of the Rhone in 1856.

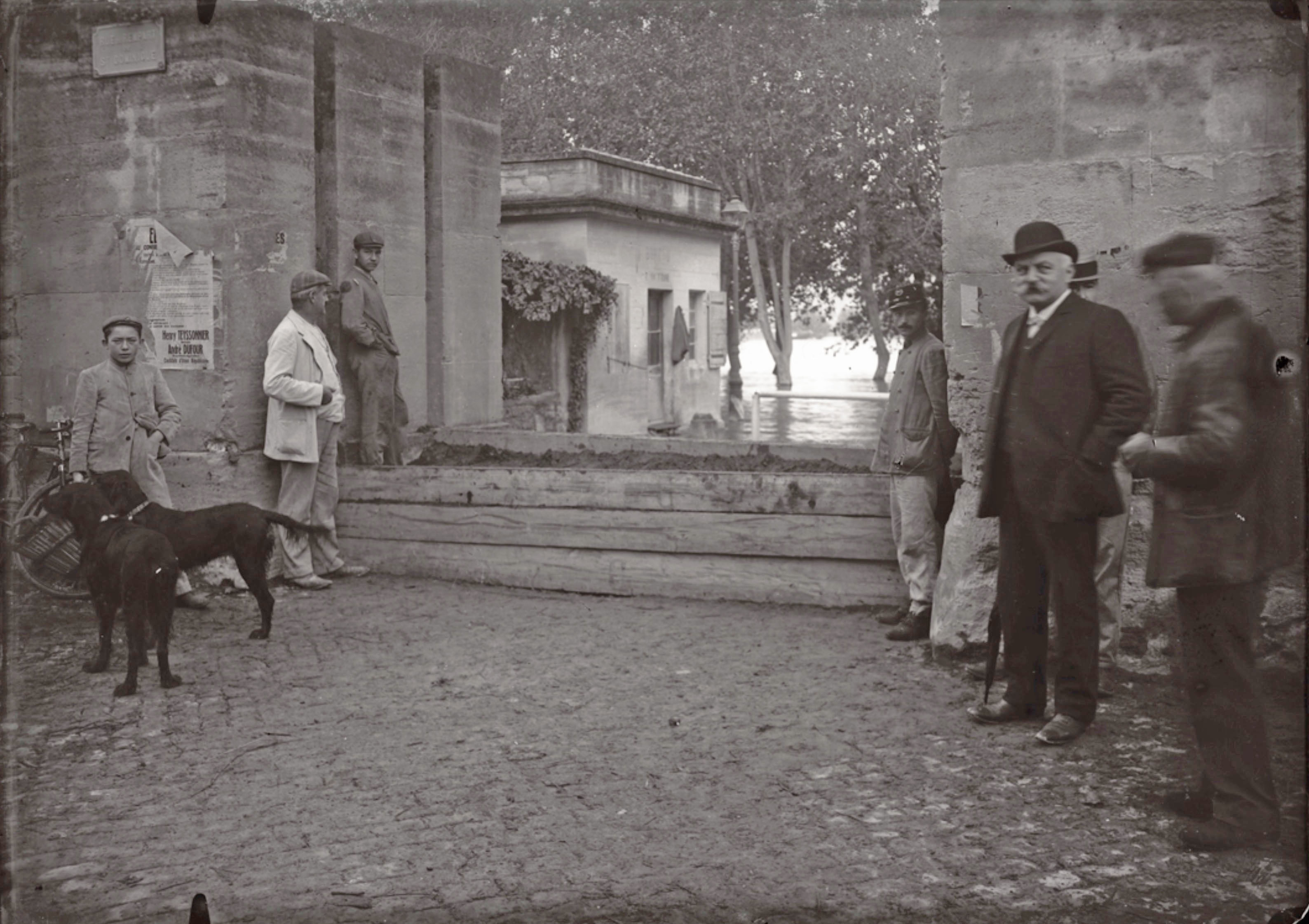
A cofferdam blocking the Porte Saint-Dominique during the floods of 1907.

After the Revolution, medieval ruins were considered an obstacle to effective town planning and in the first half of the 19th century the walls around most of the towns and villages in the Vaucluse were pulled down. The walls surrounding Avignon were spared a similar fate although they were threatened with partial demolition on several occasions.

Between 1796 and 1816-1818, the walls around the town were safeguarded as they were considered to be of military significance and were placed under the control of the French military. For the city of Avignon, an advantage of keeping the walls intact was that with only seven entrances it made collecting the octroi easier. The octroi was a tax payable on goods brought into the town. The system was abolished in 1793 during the Revolution but was reintroduced in 1800.

To facilitate easier access to the southwest part of the town, Porte Saint-Dominique was created in 1839 by opening a gap in the wall at the end of Rue Victor Hugo (formerly Rue Saint-Dominique). This was the first new entrance since three gates had been re-opened in the second half of the 17th century. It increased the number of entrances from seven to eight.

=== Walls as a flood barrier ===
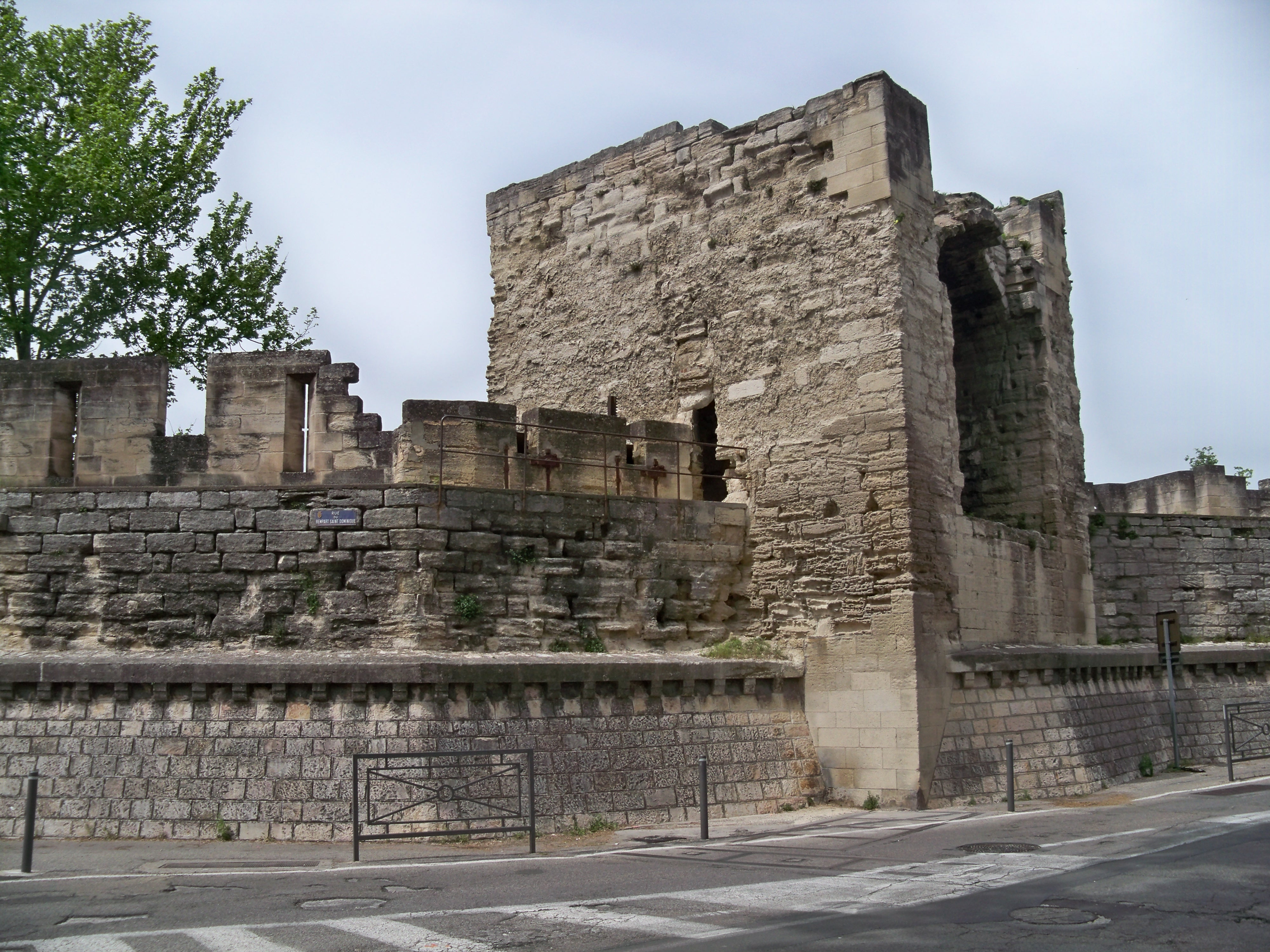
View of the interior just south of Porte Saint-Dominique showing the retaining wall added in the 19th century to strengthen the base of the structure.

The town had always been subject to flooding by the Rhône. In November 1840 the river reached a height of 8.32 metres (27.3 ft), the highest that has ever been recorded. (Note: The river at Avignon is now maintained at a height of 3.55 metres (11.6 ft) by the dam downstream at Vallabrègues so the 1840 flood peaked at a height of 4.77 metres (15.6 ft) above the current river level.) It caused severe flooding in the town with most streets under water. In some areas the water reached the first floor level of the houses. The flooding lasted for over three weeks and deposited large quantities of mud in the streets. Following this event the town decided to make better use of the town walls as a flood barrier and to install sluice gates on all the canals and drains. Each of the city gates was modified to facilitate the construction of a temporary cofferdam to prevent the river water entering the town. A pair of vertical slots were cut into the limestone blocks on either side of the opening. The slots were separated by a distance of between 0.5 m to 1 m and were designed to accommodate wooden planks which could be placed across the gate entrance. The gap between the sets of planks was filled with a mixture of earth and straw to create a dam.

The town was again flooded by the Rhône at the end of May 1856. A rapid thaw of snow in the Alps led to the river rising to a height of 7.83 metres (25.7 ft), only 0.49 metres (1.6 ft) lower than in 1840. A sluice gate on a small sewer failed at the end of Rue Conduit Perrot near Porte Saint-Lazare at the northeast corner of the town. Almost at the same time a 30 metres (98 ft) section of the medieval wall collapsed at the opposite corner of the town between Port Saint-Dominique and Port Saint-Roch. The collapse sent a wave of water 1.5 metres (4.9 ft) high sweeping along the streets and flooded three quarters of the town.

Between 1860 and 1870 the base of the walls on the inside were strengthened by the addition of a retaining wall. This was a large project and required the demolition of buildings that had been constructed against the medieval wall. The reinforcement was clad with marble from Tavel, Gard, a denser stone that is more resistant to the humidity.

Hastily constructed cotterdams prevented water flowing through the gates into the town when the Rhône flooded in December 2003. Outside the walls to the west of town, the Allées de l'Oulle were completely under water. Within the walls, some areas to the east of the centre were flooded to a depth of a few tens of centimeters due to the high level of the water table.

== List of modern entrances ==
There are now around 25 entrances through the city walls. Of these, ten are restricted to pedestrians. The list below begins at the north of the town to the east of the Rocher des Doms and progresses in a clockwise direction.

Image	Gate	Notes
	Poterne Banasterie	Pedestrian entrance opened in the 1980s
	Porte de la Ligne	In the 14th century there were two gates in the stretch of wall directly to the east of the Rocher des Doms: Porte Aurose and Porte de la Palefrenerie. Porte Aurose was located near the position of the modern Poterne Banasterie. At an early date, perhaps at the end of the 14th century, Porte Aurose was closed. Porte de la Palefrenerie became known as Porte de la Ligne. In 1755–1757 the Porte de la Ligne was moved and rebuilt in the classical style by Jean-Pierre Franque in its present position at the end of rue Palaphanerie. (Note: The positions of the 13th century gates and towers between the Rocher des Doms and the Porte Saint-Lazare are not well documented. Joseph Girard in his 1958 book Évocation du Vieil Avignon suggests that the Porte de la Palefrenerie was removed in the 15th century and that the Porte Aurose remained in use. In Girard's narrative in the 18th century the Porte Aurose, then referred to as Porte de la Ligne, was moved from its original position at the end of rue Banasterie to its present position at the end of rue Palapharneri. This account conflicts with evidence from 17th century plans and pictures that show an entrance to the town at a position well away from the Rocher des Doms. A complication is that there was a gate with the same name in the earlier 13th century walls, the Portail Aurose, that was not demolished until 1738.) (Note: The name Aurose is derived from Provençal dialect Auro meaning "wind". The mistral could be particularly violent at this northern edge of the town. The word ligne is derived from the Provençal ligno or legno meaning "wood" or more specifically "firewood". The gate gave access to the Quai de la Ligne where wood was brought.) The gate was restored in 2003.
	Porte Saint-Joseph	Tower opened in 1965. Referred to as the "tour de la Navigation", it was purchased by the town from the French state in 1826 and until 1851 housed the office controlling navigation on the Rhône.
	Poterne Saint-Lazare	Pedestrian entrance through small tower opened in 1974
	Porte Saint-Lazare	One of the original 14th century entrances. A fortified avant-corps was constructed to protect the gate by Antoine Carteron in 1488. This was replaced in 1568 during the Wars of Religion by a ravelin. The gate was restored and a second entrance created in 1882. At the same time the remains of the ravelin were demolished.
	Porte de l'Université	Tower opened in 1962 to allow access to the Hôpital Sainte-Marthe. Avignon University now occupies the former site of the hospital. Porte Sainte-Marthe is another name for this entrance.
	Poterne Chabran	Tower opened in 1903 to allow easy access to the town from the army barracks outside the walls, the Caserne Chabran. The Caserne Chabran is now occupied by the Préfecture de Vaucluse.
	Porte Thiers	Gap created in 1879, enlarged in 1908
	Poterne des Teinturiers	Passageway opened in 1995. The tower, La Pyramide, contains sluices that control the flow of water from the Sorgue to within the city walls. (Note: In the 14th century this tower was given the name "Tour Saint-Esprit". It later became "Tour du Bourreau" and "Tour du Moulin des Mort".)
	Porte Limbert	14th century gate demolished in 1896 to allow more space for an electric tramline. A ravelin, constructed to protect the gate at the end of the 16th century, was demolished in 1760.
	Portail Magnanen	Gap opened in 1902
	Porte Saint-Michel	Original 14th century name was Porte Saint-Antoine. In 1595 during the Wars of Religion a ravelin was constructed outside the gate. In 1679 the gate of the ravelin was converted into a triumphal arch. This arch was demolished when Eugène Viollet-le-Duc rebuilt the gate in 1868. Damaged by American bombs in World War II the gate was restored in 1951.
	Poterne Monclar	Two small lateral openings created in the tower in 1972.
	Porte de la République	Gap opened in 1855 to allow access to the railway station. In 1863 Viollet-le-Duc removed two old towers in the existing walls and built a fantasy tower on either side of the gap.
	Porte Saint-Charles	Gap opened in 1902
	Porte Saint-Roch	The original 14th century name was Portail des Miracles. It later became Porte de Champfleury. Closed during the Wars of Religion (1562–1598), it was reopened in 1661. The gate was restored in 1742 and then rebuilt by Viollet-le-Duc in 1865.
	Poterne Raspail	Pedestrian entrance through a small tower opened in 1972
	Porte Saint-Dominique	Gap opened in 1839, enlarged in 1953. This is close to the site of an original 14th century gate, the Porte des Prêcheurs or Porte des Dominicains, that was walled-up at the end of the 14th century.
	Poterne de l'Oratoire	Pedestrian entrance opened in the 1980s.
	Porte de l'Oulle	The original 14th century name was Porte Sainte-Jacques, it later became Porte du Limas. The gate was walled up during the Wars of Religion, and opened again in 1663. Rebuilt by Jean-Baptiste Péru in 1785–1786 20 metres north of the original position, it was demolished in 1900. Oulle or Oulo is a "cooking pot" in the Provençal dialect. They were sold in a nearby market.
	Poterne Georges Pompidou	Pedestrian entrance opened in the 1980s
	Porte du Rhône	This was one of the 14th century entrances. Its original name was Ayguière or Eyguière. (Note: The spelling of the original name varied: Ayguière, Eyguière, Aiguière etc. Aigo means "water" in the Provençal dialect.) During the Wars of Religion the gate was protected by a ravelin. It was rebuilt in a classical style by Jean-Pierre Franque in 1761.
	Le Châtelet	The gatehouse controlled access to the town from the bridge. A tower constructed in 1368 was replaced by a larger tower in 1380. During the Western Schism Aragonese troops paid by the antipope Benedict XIII defended the papal palaces and bridge tower against attacks by people from the town. The bridge tower collapsed in 1410 during this conflict and was rebuilt in 1414. The bartizans at the corners were added in 1490.
	Tour Polygonale	Pedestrian entrance through a tower that was built at the end of the 15th century. The tower is also referred to Tour des Chiens and confusingly as Tour Octogonale although there are eleven sides at the base and ten at the top.
	Porte du Rocher	Pair of tunnels for vehicles through the rock that were opened in 1974. They provide access to La Place Ferruce and an underground car park.

== See also ==
- Timeline of Avignon

== Sources ==
- Breton, Alain (1997). "La Porte de la Ligne". Annuaire de la Société des Amis du Palais des Papes. 74: 51–58.
- Carru, Dominique (1999). "Le Rhône à Avignon: données archéologiques" (PDF). Gallia (in French). 56: 109–120. doi:10.3406/galia.1999.3248.
- Clap, Sylvestre; Huet, Oliver (2005). Les Remparts d'Avignon (in French). Avignon: Benezet. ISBN 2-9522-367-1-2.
- Gagnière, Sylvain; et al. (1979). Histoire d'Avignon (in French). Aix-en-Provence, France: Édisud. ISBN 2-85744-056-1.
- Gagnière, Sylvain; Granier, Jean (1978). Images du Vieil Avignon : 126 documents anciens choisis et commentés (in French). Avignon: Rullière-Libeccio. OCLC 919032410.
- Girard, Joseph (1958). Évocation du Vieil Avignon (in French). Paris: Les Éditions de Minuit. OCLC 5391399.
- Grégoire, George Florence (1836). Histoire Ecclésiastique des Francs (in Latin and French). Vol. 1. J. Guadet, translator. Paris: J. Renouard.
- Hayez, Anne-Marie (1978). "Travaux à l'enceinte d'Avignon sous les pontificats d'Urbain V et de Grégoire XI". La Guerre et la paix, frontières et violences au Moyen âge: Actes du 101e Congrès National des Sociétés Savantes, Lille, 1976 (in French). Paris: Secrétariat d'Etat aux Universités. Comité des Travaux Historiques et Scientifiques. pp. 193–223. ISBN 978-2-7177-1430-2.
- Maureau, Alain (1994). "Les remparts d'Avignon au XIXe siècle". Provence Historique (in French). 44 (176): 211–223.
- Mistral, Frédéric (1879a). Lou Trésor dou Félibrige ou Dictionnaire provençal-français (in French and Occitan). Vol. 1: A-F. Aix-en-Provence: J. Remondet-Aubin.
- Mistral, Frédéric (1879b). Lou Trésor dou Félibrige ou Dictionnaire provençal-français (in French and Occitan). Vol. 2: G-Z. Aix-en-Provence: J. Remondet-Aubin.
- Pansier, Pierre (1910). "Les rues d'Avignon au Moyen Âge". Mémoires de l'Académie de Vaucluse. 2nd series (in French). 10: 41–74, 147–200, 209–244.
- Pansier, Pierre (1911). "Les rues d'Avignon au Moyen Âge (suite)". Mémoires de l'Académie de Vaucluse. 2nd series (in French). 11: 89–101, 281–322, 355–405.
- Pansier, Pierre (1930). "La Tour du Pont d'Avignon" (PDF). Annales d'Avignon et du Comtat Venaissin (in French). 16: 5–19.
- Rolland, Franck (1989). "Un mur oublié : le rempart du XIIIe siècle à Avignon". Archéologie Médiévale (in French). 19: 173–208. doi:10.3406/arcme.1989.955.
- Rollo-Koster, Joëlle (2015). Avignon and Its Papacy, 1309–1417: Popes, Institutions, and Society. Lanham, Maryland: Rowman and Littlefield. ISBN 978-1-4422-1532-0.
- Taupin, Jean-Louis (1971). "Les murs d'Avignon". Les Monuments Historiques de la France (in French). 17 (2–3): 141–186.
