= Sur le Pont d'Avignon =

French song

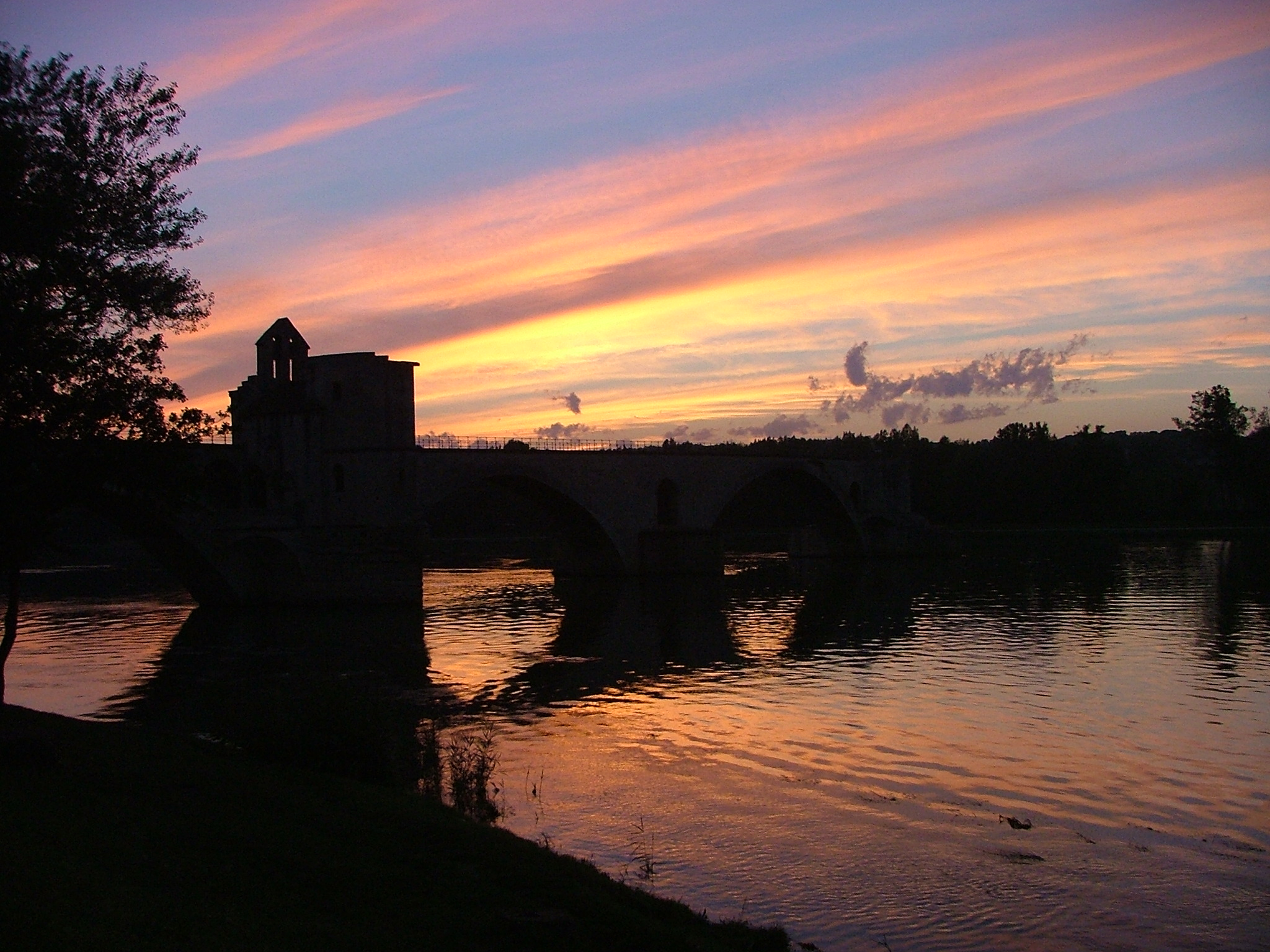
Pont d’Avignon at dusk

“Sur le pont d’Avignon” (pronounced [syʁ lə pɔ̃ daviɲɔ̃]) (“On the Bridge of Avignon”; Occitan: Sus la pèira d’Avinhon) is a French song about a dance performed on the Pont d’Avignon (officially Pont Saint-Bénézet) that dates back to the 15th century. The dance actually took place under the bridge and not on the bridge (sous le Pont d’Avignon, not sur).

== Dance description ==
1. The dance starts out with everyone in pairs, dancing around each other.
2. When the chorus is done dancers must stop in front of their partners, and traditionally the male will bow on the first part then tip his hat on the second.
3. When the chorus begins again the dancers repeat step one.
4. When this stops, so does the dance. The girl curtsies to one side, then the other.
5. For the first part, dancers repeat step one, and if they have an audience, turn on their heels and bow to them.

== Lyrics ==
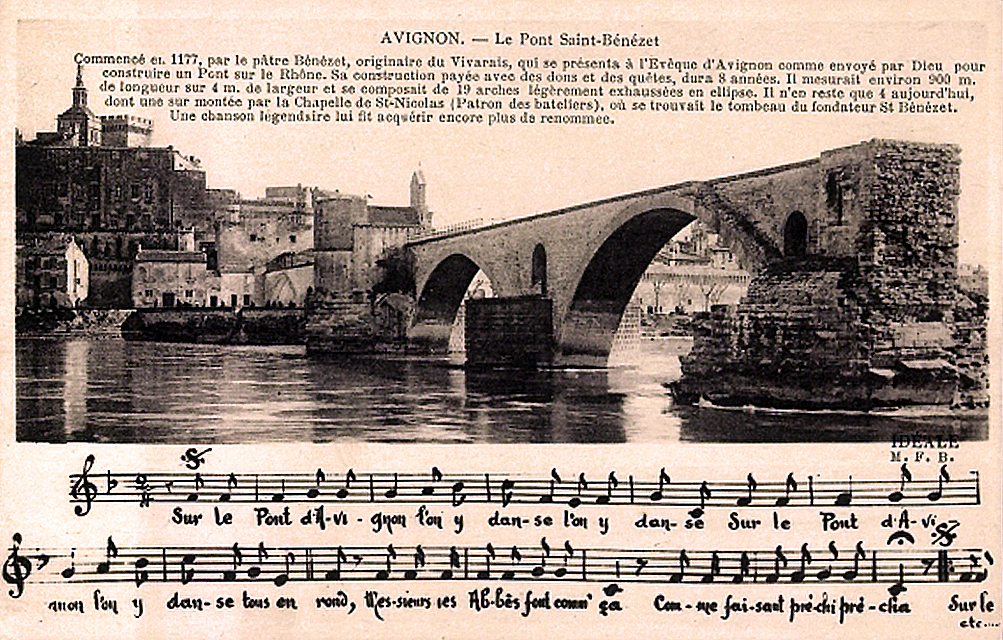
Pont d’Avignon and its song

Chorus
Sur le pont d’Avignon
l’on y danse, l’on y danse.
Sur le pont d’Avignon
l’on y danse tous en rond.

1. Les beaux messieurs font comme ça,
et puis encore comme ça.
Chorus
2. Les belles dames font comme ça, … Chorus
3. Les filles font comme ça, … Chorus
4. Les musiciens font comme ça, … Chorus

On the bridge of Avignon
they are dancing there, they are dancing there.
On the bridge of Avignon
all dance in circles there.

The fine gentlemen go like this (bow)
and then again like this.
Chorus
The beautiful ladies go like this (curtsy) …
The young girls go like this (salute) …
The musicians go like this (they all bow to women) …

Any number of verses may be invented, depicting other professions or various characters.

== Melody ==
Source

== In other media ==
In 1951, the National Film Board of Canada produced the 5-minute animated film Sur le pont d’Avignon, in which extravagantly dressed marionettes pantomime the song.

In 1992, a cartoon titled The Real Story of … Sur le pont d’Avignon was produced by CINAR and France Animation, featuring the song and a ghost story revolving around a clockmaker and an enchanted organ.

Mary Stewart’s 1955 romantic thriller “Madam, Will You Talk?” is set in Avignon and features two of the main characters getting to know each other while on a day trip to “the old bridge of the song … its four remaining arches soaring out across the green water”. They sing the song “in the style of Jean Sablon,” and the child character tells the adult “the story of St. Benezet who confounded the clerics of Avignon, and built the bridge where the angels had told him.”
