= Pont Saint-Bénézet =

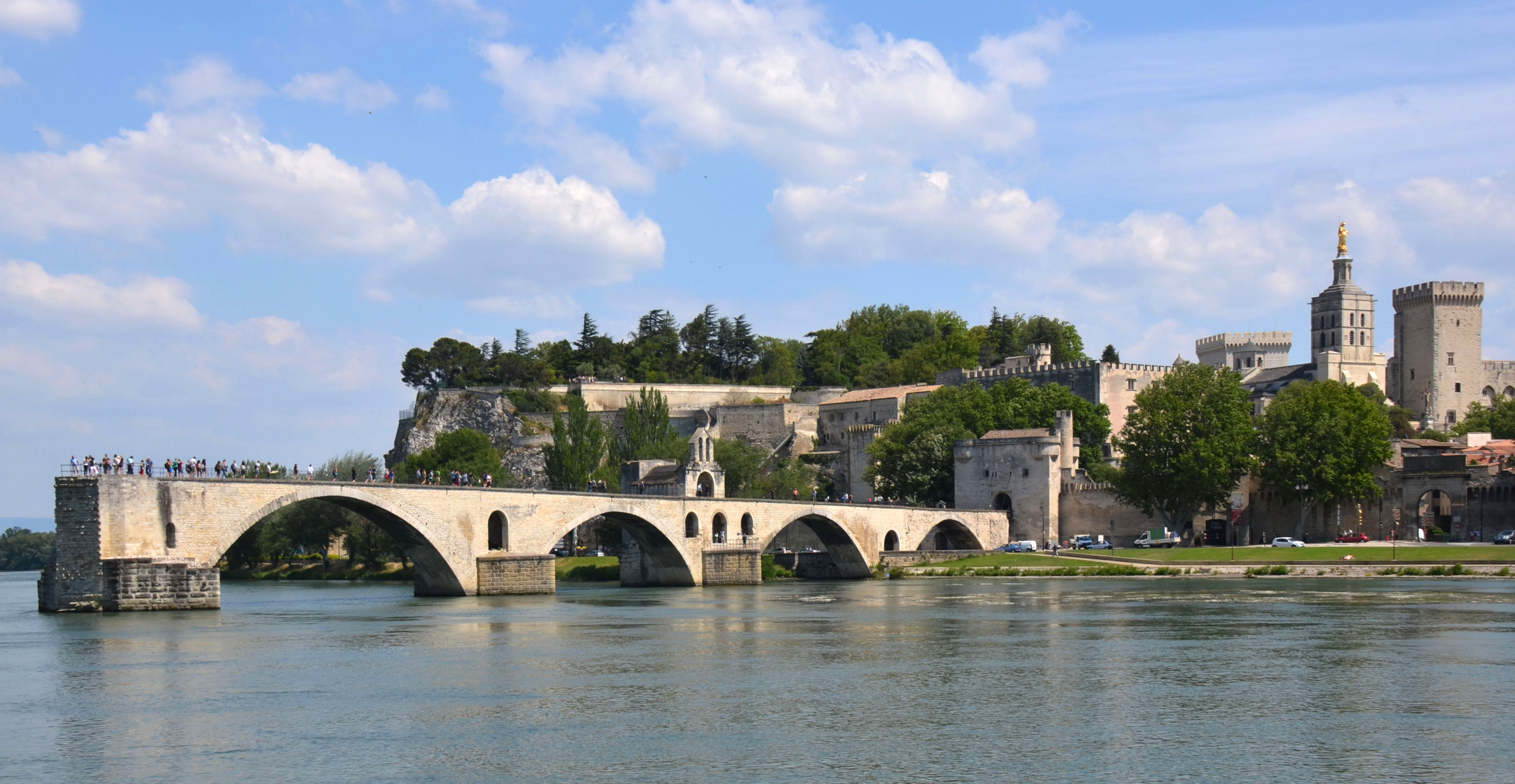
- The surviving four arches of the Pont St-Bénézet

- Location within France
- 43°57′14″N 4°48′18″E

History
- Built: 1177–1185

UNESCO World Heritage Site
- Official name: Historic Centre of Avignon: Papal Palace, Episcopal Ensemble and Avignon Bridge
- Type: Cultural
- Criteria: i, ii, iv
- Designated: 1995
- Reference no.: 228

Monument historique
- Official name: Chapelle et pont Saint-Bénézet
- Designated: 1840
- Reference no.: PA00081815

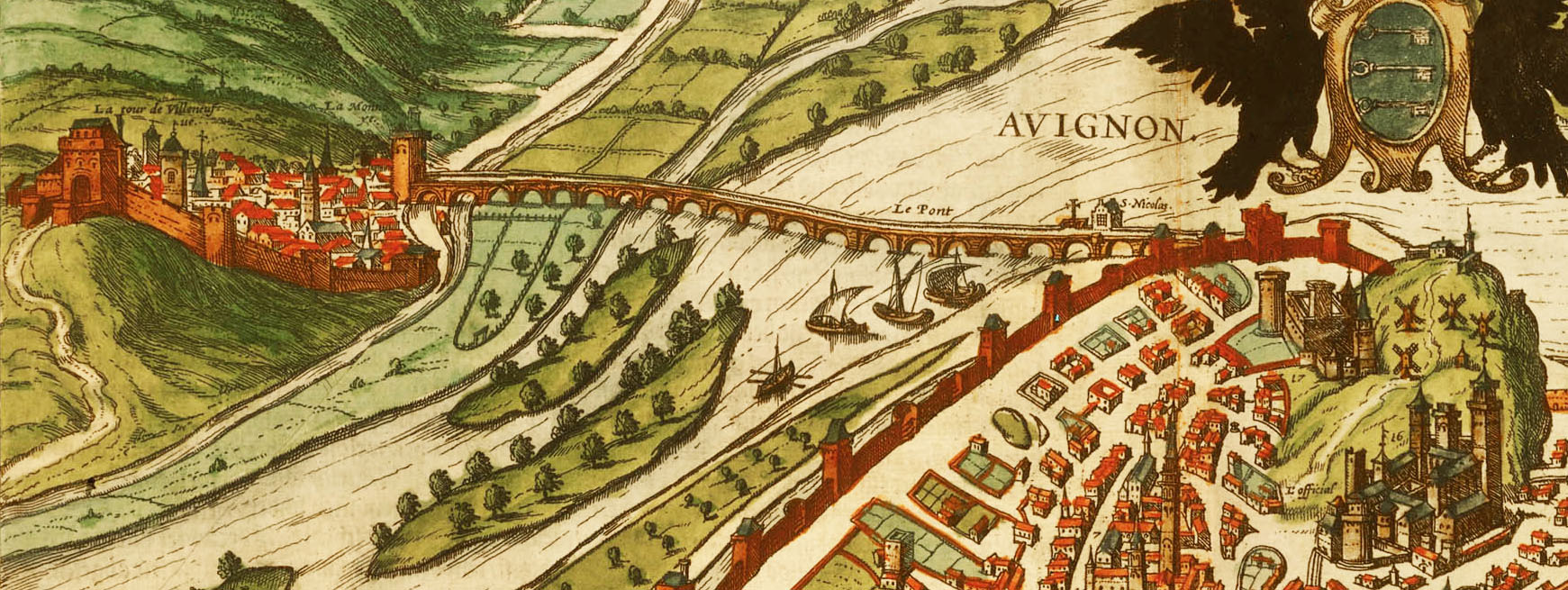
The bridge in a print published in 1575 with the arches intact

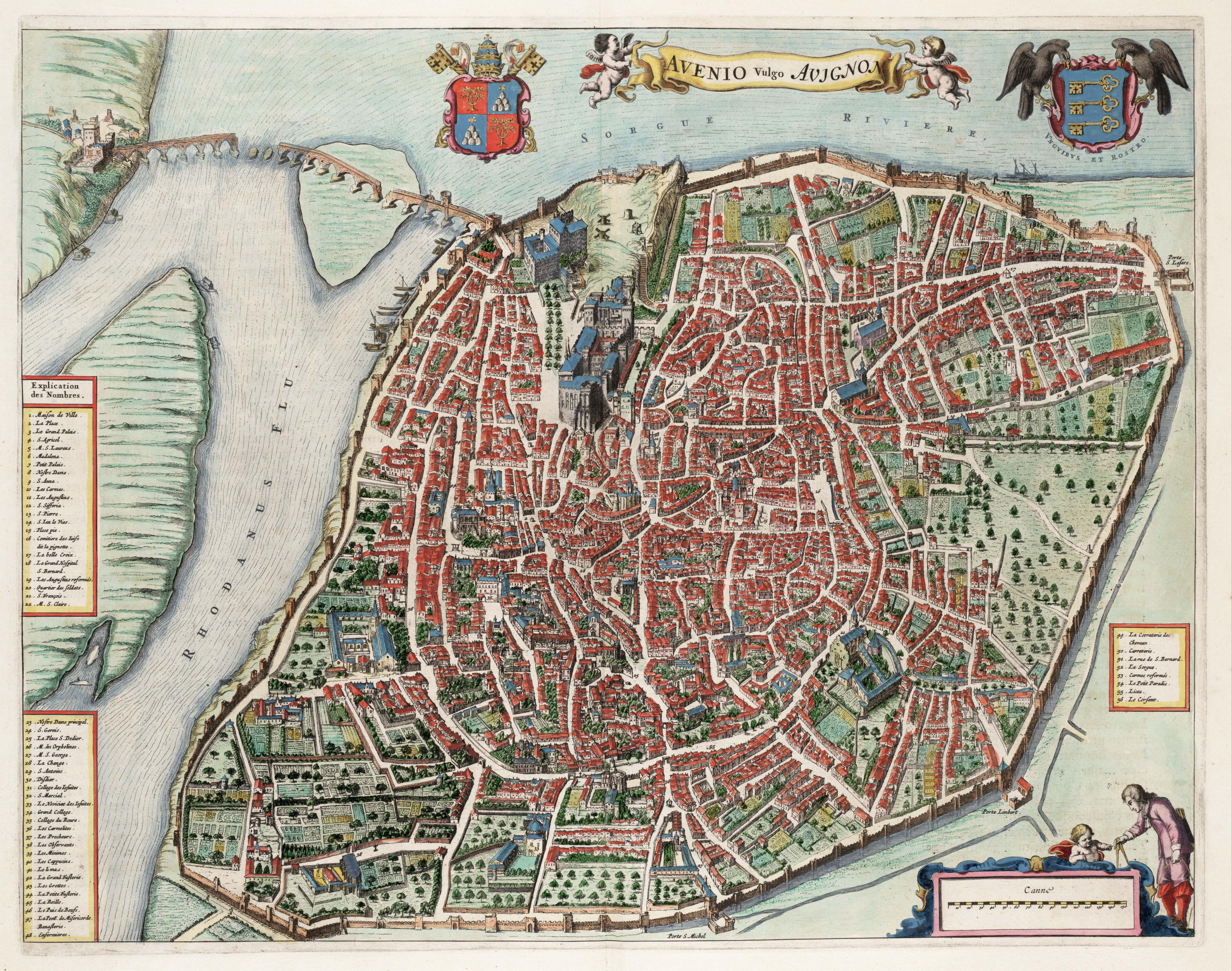
Map of Avignon showing missing arches printed in 1663, but based on a map from 1618

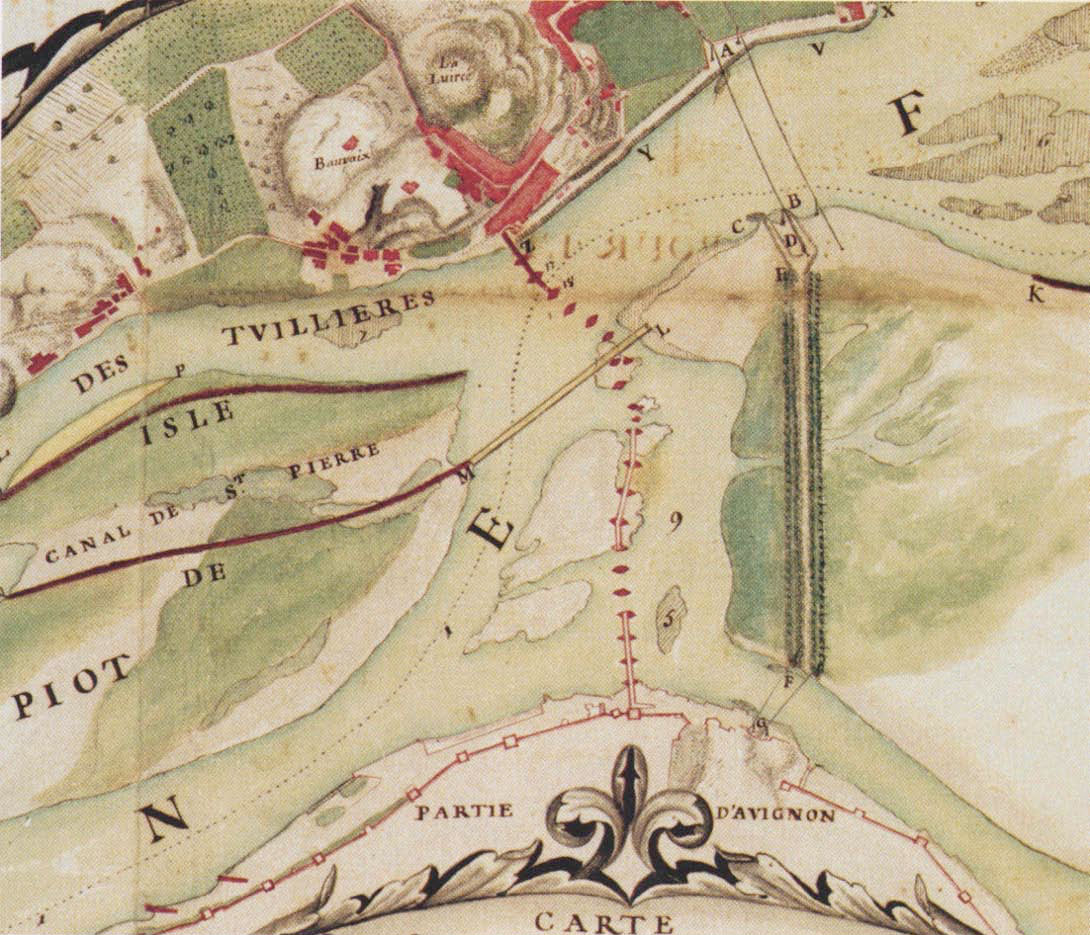
Map from 1685 showing the piers of the bridge. The pier on the bank near the Tour Philippe-le-Bel has been omitted. By this date 10 of the 22 arches had collapsed.

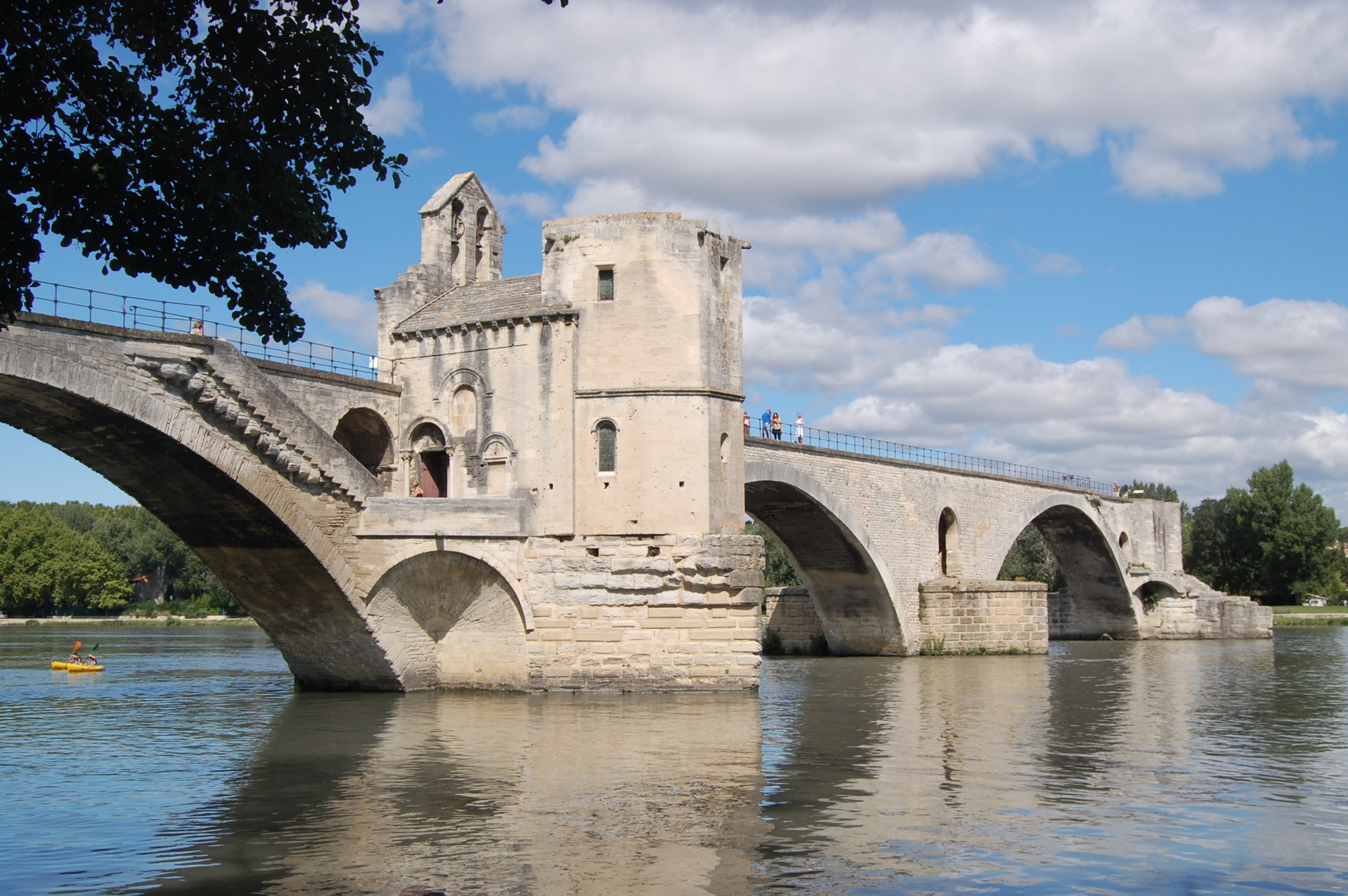
The north side of the bridge with the Chapel of Saint Nicholas

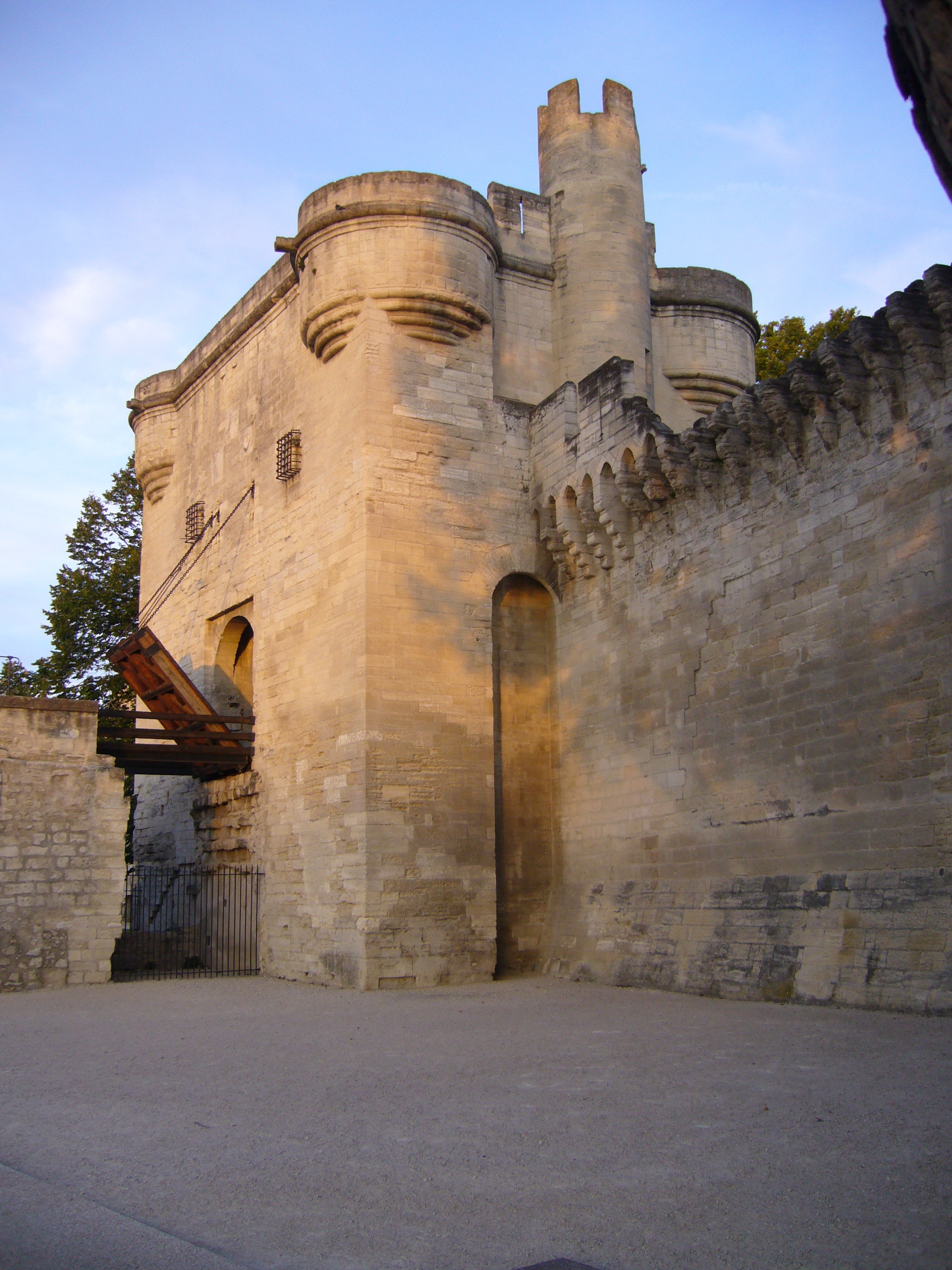
Drawbridge connecting the bridge to the gatehouse in the city wall

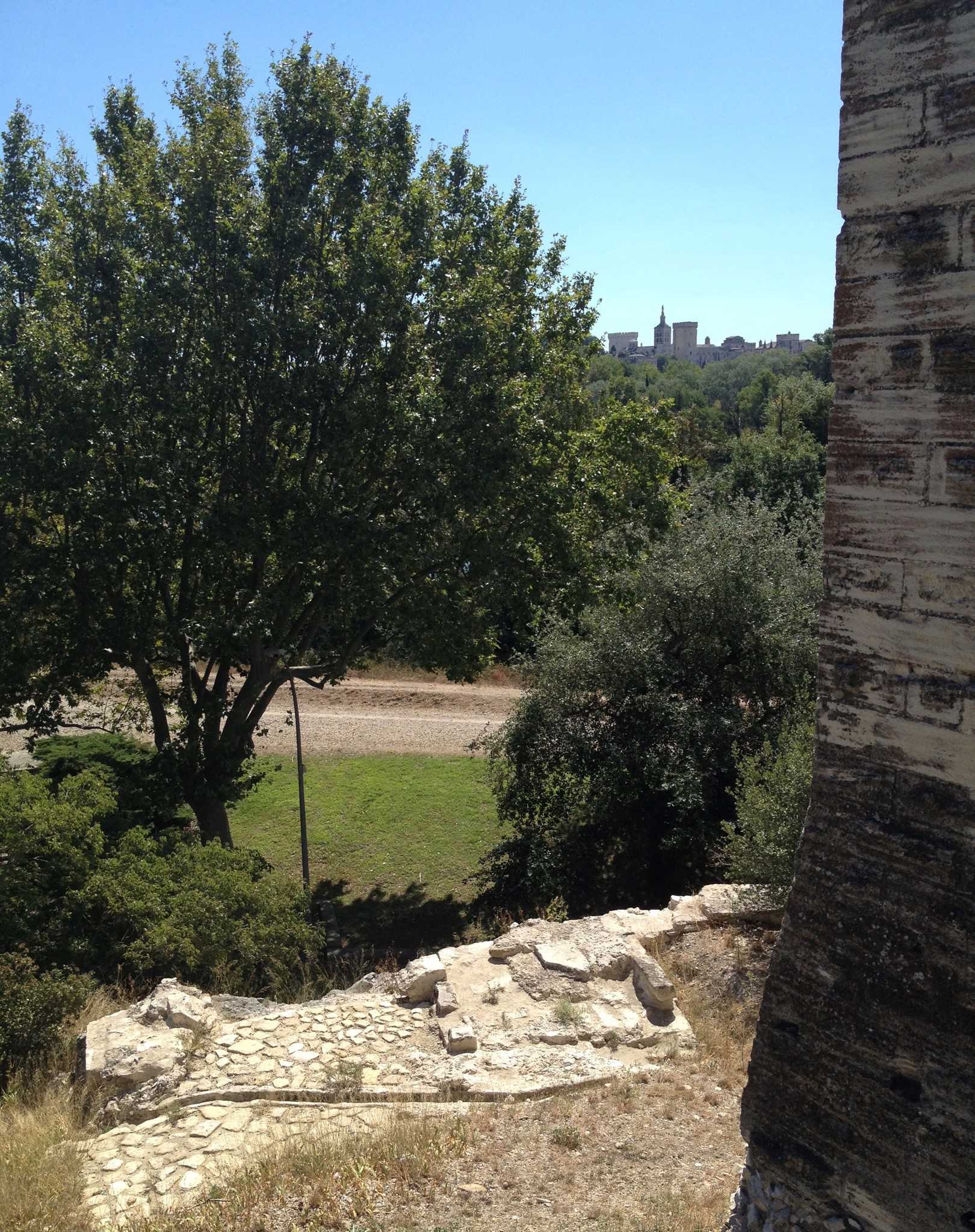
Remains of the gatehouse leading to the bridge, below the Tour Phillipe-le-Bel

The Pont Saint-Bénézet (French pronunciation: [pɔ̃ sɛ̃ benezɛ]; Provençal: Pònt de Sant Beneset), also known as the Pont d'Avignon (IPA: [pɔ̃ daviɲɔ̃]; Occitan: Pont d'Avinhon), was a medieval bridge across the Rhône in the town of Avignon, in southern France. Only four arches survive.

An early wooden bridge spanning the Rhône between Villeneuve-lès-Avignon and Avignon was built between 1177 and 1185. This wooden bridge was destroyed forty years later in 1226 during the Albigensian Crusade when Louis VIII of France laid siege to Avignon. Beginning in 1234 the bridge was rebuilt with 22 stone arches. The stone bridge was about 900 m (980 yd) in length and only 4.9 m (16 ft 1 in) in width, including the parapets at the sides. The bridge was abandoned in the mid-17th century as the arches tended to collapse each time the Rhône flooded, making it very expensive to maintain. Four arches and the gatehouse at the Avignon end of the bridge have survived.

The Chapel of Saint Nicholas which sits on the second pier of the bridge, was constructed in the second half of 12th century but has since been substantially altered. The western terminus, the Tour Philippe-le-Bel, is also preserved.

The bridge was the inspiration for the song Sur le pont d'Avignon and is considered a landmark of the city. In 1995, the surviving arches of the bridge were classified as a World Heritage Site, together with the Palais des Papes, Cathédrale Notre-Dame des Doms, and other monuments from the historic centre of Avignon, because of its testimony to Avignon's leading role in the Papacy during the 14th and 15th centuries.

== History ==
The bridge spanned the Rhône between Avignon and Villeneuve-lès-Avignon. The first bridge was built between 1177 and 1185 but was destroyed during the siege of Avignon by Louis VIII of France in 1226. Beginning in 1234 the bridge was rebuilt. Historians have suggested that the first bridge would have been either constructed entirely of wood or may have been a wooden superstructure supported on stone piers. Only when rebuilt was the bridge constructed entirely in stone. (Note: The bridge is mentioned in a letter sent by the prelates and barons of the army of Louis VIII to the Emperor Frederick II in 1226 justifying their conduct in the siege of Avignon. The letter refers to a wooden bridge built by the citizens of Avignon: "quam transire permisserant per pontem ligneum quem extra villam facerant".) The stone bridge had 22 arches and 21 piers and a length of some 900 m (980 yd). It did not run directly between the two gatehouses, but instead followed a curved path, probably an adaption to the position of the islands at the time.

Over the centuries the Rhône has shifted across its floodplain. The position of the islands in the 13th century is not well documented but a 17th-century map shows that the southern end of the Île de la Barthelasse was upstream of the bridge. The bridge crossed small islands that lay upstream of the Île de Piot. The spacing between the piers varied between 37 and 52 m (121 and 171 ft). The bridge was only 4.9 m (16 ft 1 in) in width, including the parapets at the sides. The arches were liable to collapse when the river flooded and were sometimes replaced with temporary wooden structures before being rebuilt in stone. (Note: There are records of repairs to the bridge in 1321, 1324, under Pope Clement VI in 1347, 1375, four arches were rebuilt by the antipope Clement VII in 1380, 1431, two arches and some of town walls collapsed in 1471, and were rebuilt by Louis XI in 1479, one arch collapsed in 1603 and two collapsed in 1633.)

The bridge fell into a state of disrepair during the first half of the 17th century. By 1644 the bridge was missing four arches, and a flood in 1669 swept away more of the structure. Since then, its surviving arches have successively collapsed or been demolished and only four of the arches remain. The only other visible vestige of the bridge is some masonry from pier 11 that is attached to a private building on the Île de la Barthelasse. (Note: Piers are numbered starting from the Avignon side of the river with piers 1 to 4 supporting the surviving arches. The ruins of pier 11 are located at 43°57′24.61″N 4°48′9.14″E.) Remains of other piers are buried under a thick layer of sediment on the island or at the bottom of the Rhône. The locations of piers 9 and 10, both now on the Île de la Barthelasse, were confirmed by cores drilled at their expected positions. Masonry from the piers was reached at a depth of 3 m (10 ft) below ground level. Just below the masonry, at a depth of around 6.7 m (22 ft 0 in), wooden fragments, identified as silver fir (Abies alba), were recovered. Carbon-14 dating of this material gave dates of 1238–1301 AD for pier 9 and 1213–1280 AD for pier 10 (the range is for 2σ).

The arches are segmental rather than the semi-circular shape typically used in Roman bridges. Of the remaining arches the largest span is 35.8 m (117 1/2 ft) between the third and fourth piers. The piers have cutwaters that are pointed both upstream and downstream. These reduce the scour around the piers, one of the main threats to the stability of stone bridges. The piers were constructed with openings in the stone work to reduce the pressure from the flow of water when river was in flood.

With the collapse of the Saint-Bénézet bridge the Rhône at Avignon was crossed by ferry until the beginning of the 19th century. Between 1806 and 1818 a wooden bridge was built across the two branches of the river, a few hundred metres south of the old bridge at the Porte de l'Oulle. The section across the Avignon branch of the Rhône was replaced by a suspension bridge in 1843. This was demolished in 1960 with the opening of the Edouard Daladier bridge. The section of the wooden bridge across the Villeneuve branch of the Rhône was not replaced until 1909. The replacement stone bridge, the Nouveau Pont, was damaged by bombing in 1944 during World War II. It was repaired after the war but was replaced by the Pont du Royaume in 1972.

=== Saint Bénézet ===
An uneducated shepherd, Bénézet (born c.1165 - died c 1184, feast day 14 April, patron saint of bridge builders) claimed that he was divinely commanded by Jesus in a vision to build the bridge at a point where the force of the Rhône was so great that it had discouraged even Roman engineers in antiquity. The bishop of Avignon, at first skeptical, finally approved the project, and work began in 1177. Bénézet reputedly overcame many obstacles miraculously, and the construction of the bridge was said to have caused 18 miraculous healings. Convinced that the work was ordained by God, wealthy patrons formed the first “Bridge-Building Brotherhood” to fund Bénézet's endeavor. He died four years before the bridge was completed and was buried in a chapel built on one of the piers. After almost 500 years his body was removed, and his relics are at Saint-Didier in Avignon.

=== Saint Nicholas Chapel ===
The Saint Nicholas Chapel sits on a platform on the upstream side of the second pier (between the second and third arches). The bridge chapel has undergone several phases of reconstruction and restoration. It is now divided into two floors, each with a nave and an apse. The upper floor is on a level with the platform of the bridge and reduces the width of the walkway to 1.75 m (5 ft 9 in). The lower floor is accessed by a set of steps that descend from the bridge.

The exterior of the chapel shows evidence of the rebuilding work with blocked windows on the south-eastern wall. The nave is covered with stone roof tiles which rest on a series of corbels. The polygonal apse has a flat roof and sits above the cutwater of the pier.

The lower chapel with its apse decorated with five arches dates from the second half of the 12th century. At a later date, perhaps as early as the 13th century when the level of the bridge was raised, a floor supported by a ribbed quadripartite vault was inserted into the structure. The simple rectangular upper chapel with the barrel vaulted roof was consecrated in 1411. A side door was created in the lower chapel as the stonework of the raised bridge blocked the original entrance. In 1513 a pentagonal apse with gothic columns was added to the upper chapel.

In 1670, after the bridge was abandoned, the relics of Saint Bénézet were transferred to the Hôpital du Pont (also called the Hôpital St Bénézet) within the city walls next to the gatehouse.

The bridge was also the site of devotion by the Rhône boatmen, whose patron saint was Saint Nicholas. They initially worshipped in the Saint Nicholas Chapel on the bridge itself (where Saint Bénézet's body was also interred) but the increasing dilapidation of the bridge made access difficult. In 1715 the confraternity of boatmen built a chapel on dry land on the Avignon side of the bridge outside the city walls next to the gatehouse. This chapel was destroyed by the major flood of the Rhône that occurred in 1856. A residence for a caretaker was built on the ruins during the restoration work undertaken beginning around 1878. The residence was demolished as part of the restoration work on the bridge and gatehouse carried out in the 1980s.

=== Gatehouses ===
The bridge had great strategic importance as when first built it was the only fixed river crossing between Lyon and the Mediterranean Sea. It was also the only river crossing between the Comtat Venaissin, an enclave controlled by the Pope, and France proper under the authority of the kings of France. As such, it was closely guarded on both sides of the river. The right bank, which was controlled by the French crown, was overlooked by the fortress of the Tour Philippe-le-Bel which was built at the beginning of the 14th century. On the Avignon side, a large gatehouse was erected in the 14th century and then extensively modified in the 15th century. The walkway passed over the city wall and down a ramp (now destroyed) which led into the city.

Between 1265 and 1309 another stone bridge was constructed across the Rhône, 40 km (25 mi) upstream from Avignon, at what is now Pont-Saint-Esprit but then known as Saint-Saturnin-du-Port. The Pont-Saint-Esprit bridge originally had 20 arches and a length of 900 m (980 yd). Although now somewhat modified, the medieval bridge has survived until the present day.

The Chapel of Saint Nicholas and the four remaining arches were listed as a Monument historique in 1840.

=== Roman bridge hypothesis ===
A scholarly debate has taken place on whether a bridge existed prior to the construction of the Saint Bénézet bridge in the 12th century. An earlier bridge was first proposed by Henri Revoil at the French Archaeological Conference held in Avignon in 1882. His main argument was based on the appearance of the stonework at the base of the four surviving piers. At very low water, stone blocks were visible which were larger than those above and had features that appeared foreign to the existing bridge. The style of the masonry indicated to Revoil that there had been an earlier bridge dating from either the late Roman or Carolingian periods. In 1892 Louis Rochetin published an article suggesting that the projecting stone blocks at the base of the first pier and those on either side of the second pier supporting the chapel were the remains of springers that would have supported earlier Roman arches.

Denis-Marcel Marié, in his book on the bridge self-published in 1953, reviewed all the previous publications and in the final chapter came out in support of the hypothesis that an early bridge had been built by the Gallo-Romans towards the end of the Roman occupation. He suggested that the bases of the surviving piers belonged to this earlier bridge and that the semi-circular arches employed during the Roman period meant that the level of the roadway would have been higher than the top of the surviving chapel. Marié surmised that this early bridge had collapsed over the following seven centuries and the 12th century Bénézet bridge had consisted of a decking supported on wooden piles linking the ruined Roman piers. The piles were necessary because the gaps between the Roman stone piers would have been too large to span with wooden beams without the intervening support. The height of the Bénézet bridge would have been at the level of the lower chapel.

Further support for the existence of a Roman bridge came in an article by Perrot et al. published in 1971. The article described a survey undertaken in 1969 on the surviving vestiges of the piers in the Villeneuve branch of the river before their total destruction by the Compagnie Nationale du Rhône (CNR). The article also included long quotes from an unpublished report by Mr Mathian, an engineer working for the CNR, on a survey carried out in 1965 on the four intact piers on the Avignon side of the river. This survey had discovered a layer of wood, at least 20 cm in thickness, under the foundations of each of the four intact piers. A sample of the wood was dated by the Centre national de la recherche scientifique (CNRS) using the radiocarbon technique to between 290 and 530 AD, corresponding to the end of the Roman Empire. (Note: The article gives no technical details of the radiocarbon dating procedure and does not specify from which pier the sample was taken.) In the survey of the ruined piers in the Villeneuve channel, a pier (listed as number 14) was found to contain wooden beams within the masonry. A sample of this wood was radiodated to 890 AD.(error estimates were not specified). During the dredging of the Villeneuve channel the remains of three large wooden piles were recovered, two of which were still shod with iron tips. Samples of wood from these were sent for dating, but at the time of the publication of the article, the results had not been received.

The archaeologist Dominique Carru, while accepting the radiocarbon date for the sample of wood, argued in 1999 that it is very unlikely that an earlier bridge existed. It is not mentioned in the surviving chronicles from the high medieval period and a bridge would have led to the development of an urban centre on the right bank of the Rhône opposite Avignon, similar to those at other locations in the Rhône valley, such as Trinquetaille opposite Arles and Saint-Romain-en-Gal near Vienne. There is no evidence for a significant early settlement near the terminus of the bridge. The main east–west route in the Roman period passed through Tarascon-Beaucaire, 20 km (12 mi) to the south, and avoided the river at Avignon which was wide and variable in position.

== The song "Sur le Pont d'Avignon" ==
The bridge has achieved worldwide fame through its commemoration by the song "Sur le Pont d'Avignon" ("On the Bridge of Avignon"). An earlier song with the same title was popular in the 16th and 17th centuries. The melody was published by Ottaviano Petrucci in his Harmonice Musices Odhecaton of 1503–04. The 16th-century composer Pierre Certon used the melody in a mass with the title of "Sus le Pont d'Avignon". The modern version of the song dates from the mid-19th century when Adolphe Adam included it in the opéra comique Le Sourd ou l'Auberge pleine which was first performed in Paris in 1853. The opera was an adaptation of the 1790 comedy by Desforges.

== Pictorial record ==
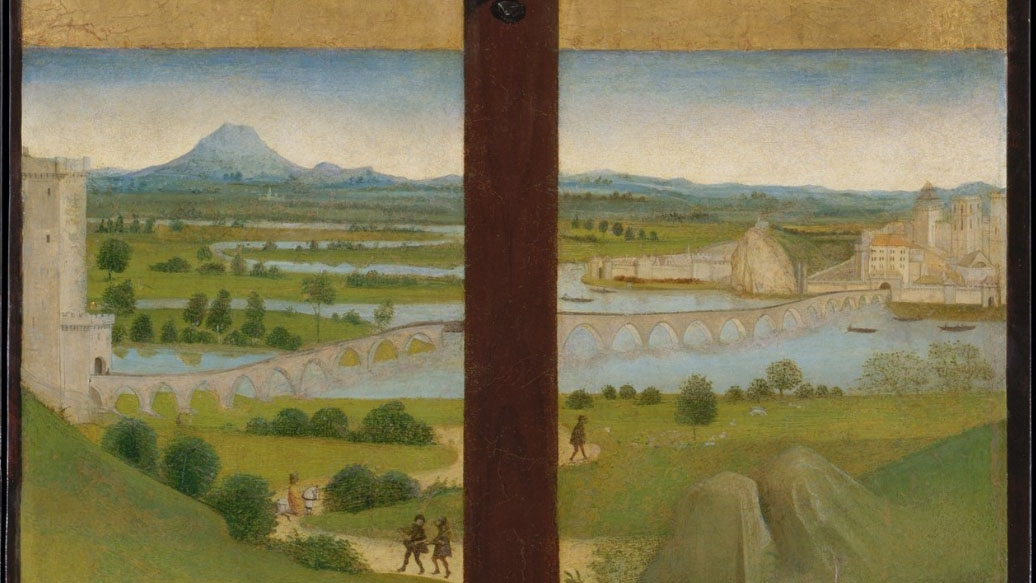
Detail from the Pérussis Altarpiece, the earliest depiction of the bridge, c. 1480. One arch near the center of the bridge has collapsed.

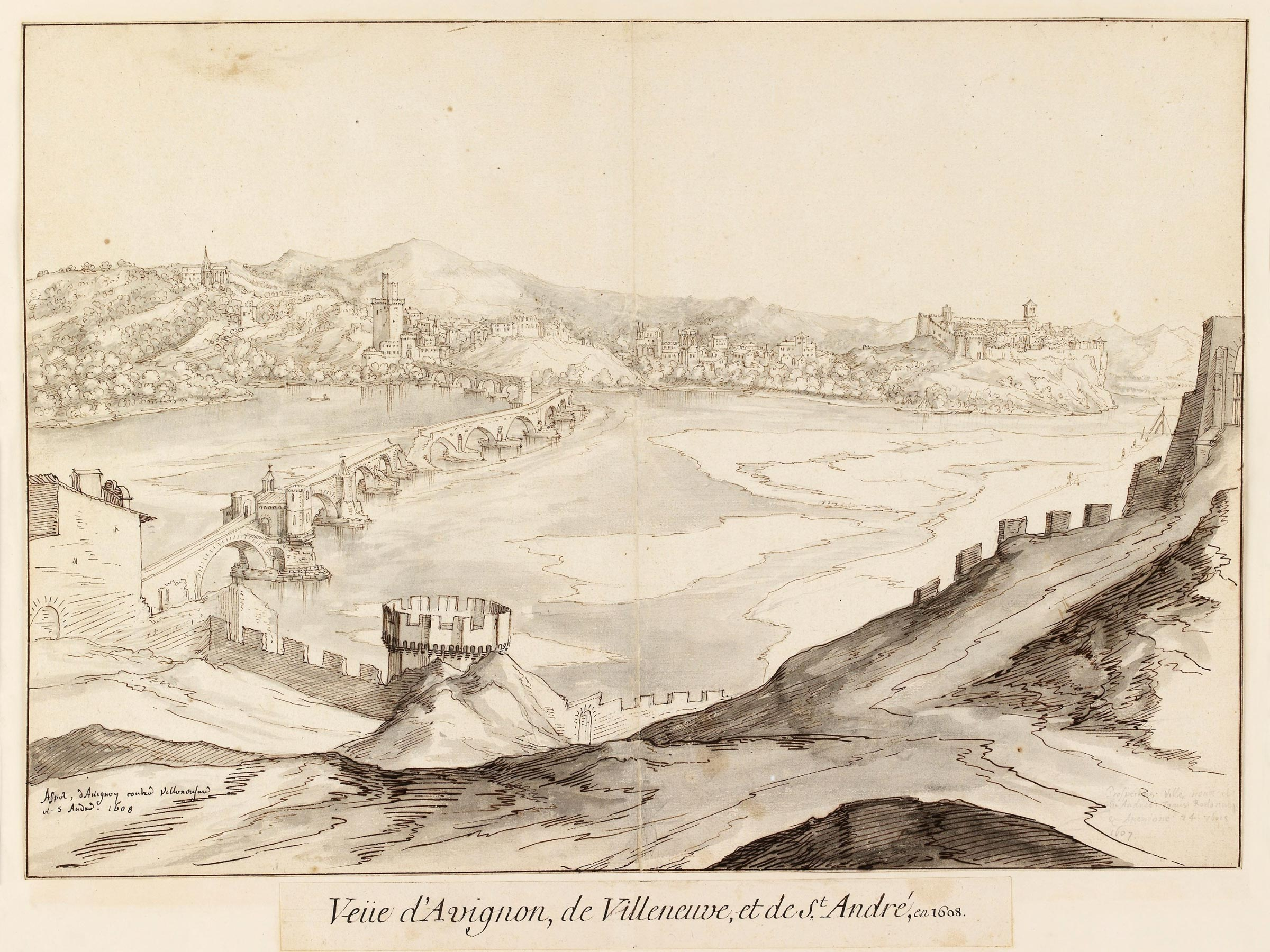
View towards Villeneuve by Étienne Martellange, 1608. Arch 7 has collapsed. Five arches near Villeneuve (18-22) are still standing.

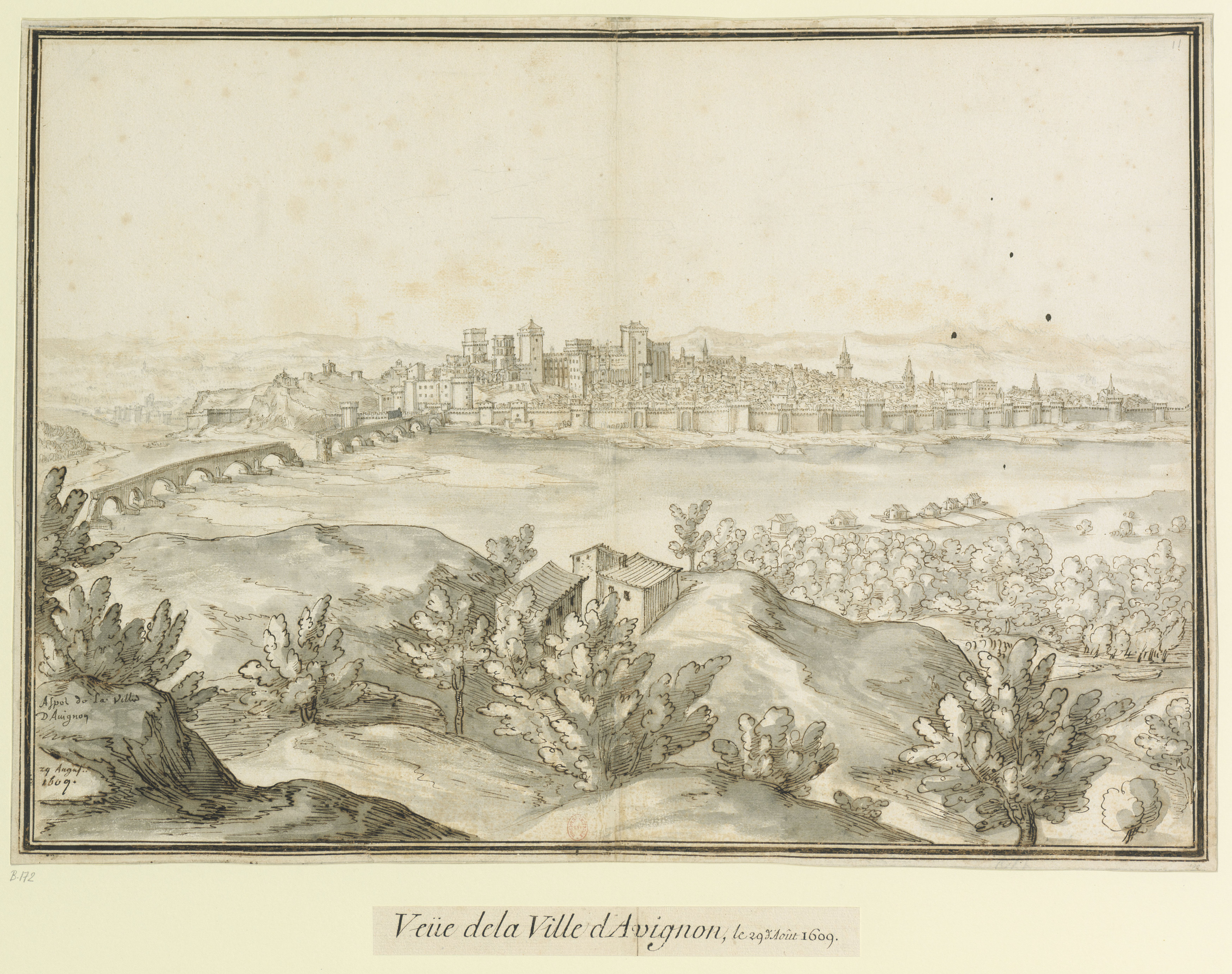
View towards Avignon by Étienne Martellange, 1609. Arches 7 and 14 have collapsed.

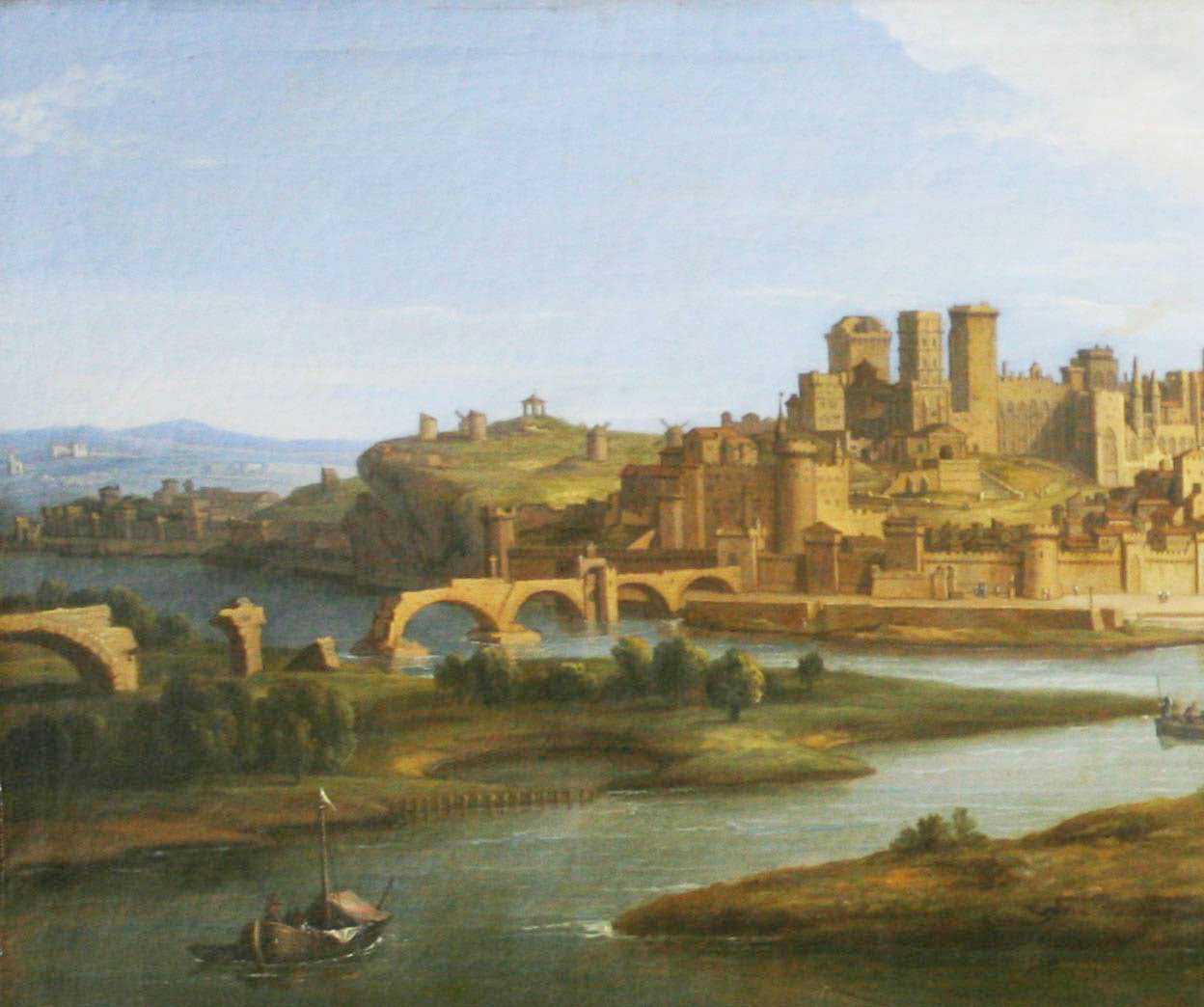
View of the bridge in 1700 by Robert Bonnart. Arches 5 to 7 have collapsed.

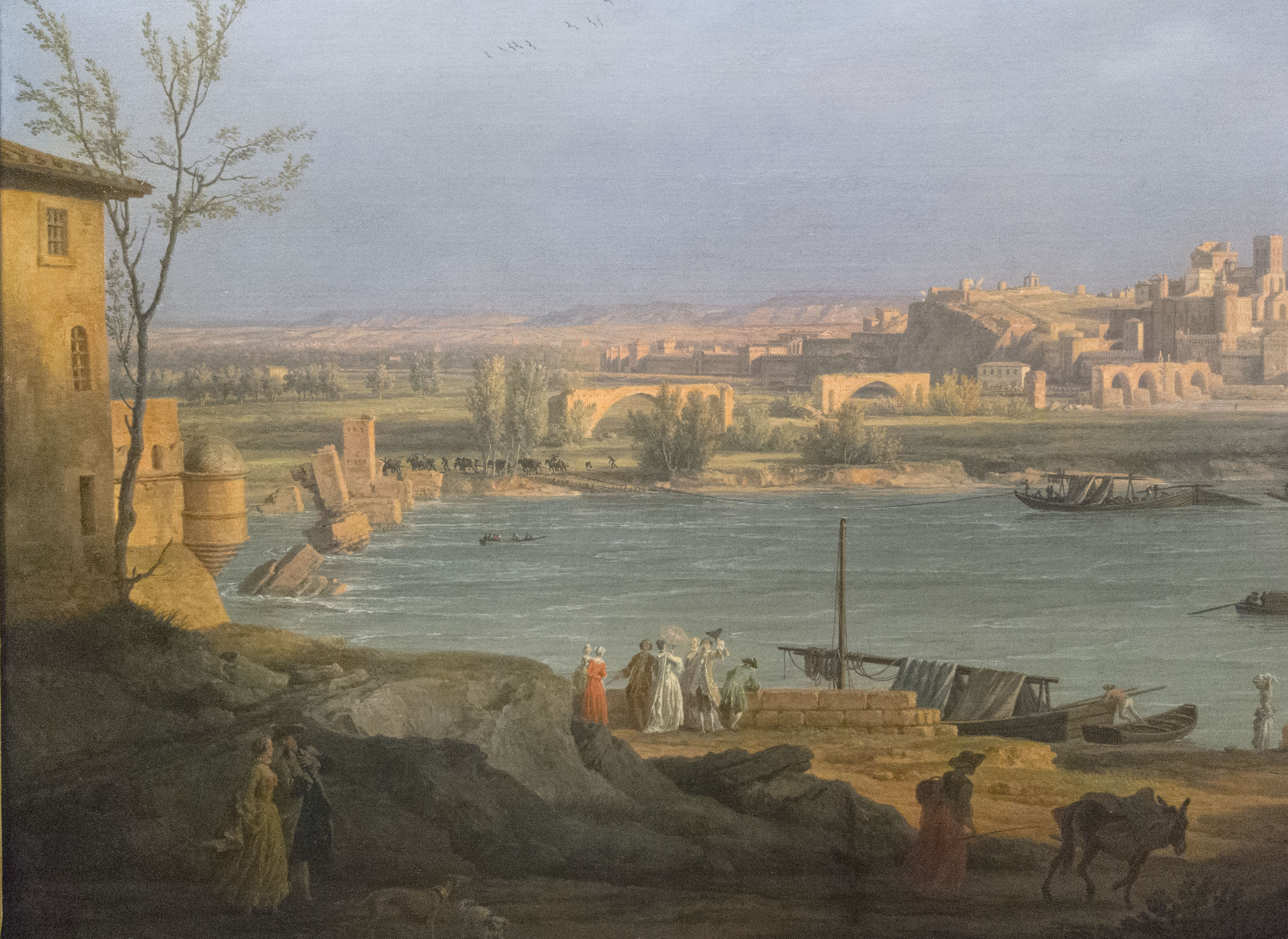
The ruined bridge as depicted by Joseph Vernet in View of Avignon from the Right Bank of the Rhone, 1757. Arches 9 and 11 are still standing.

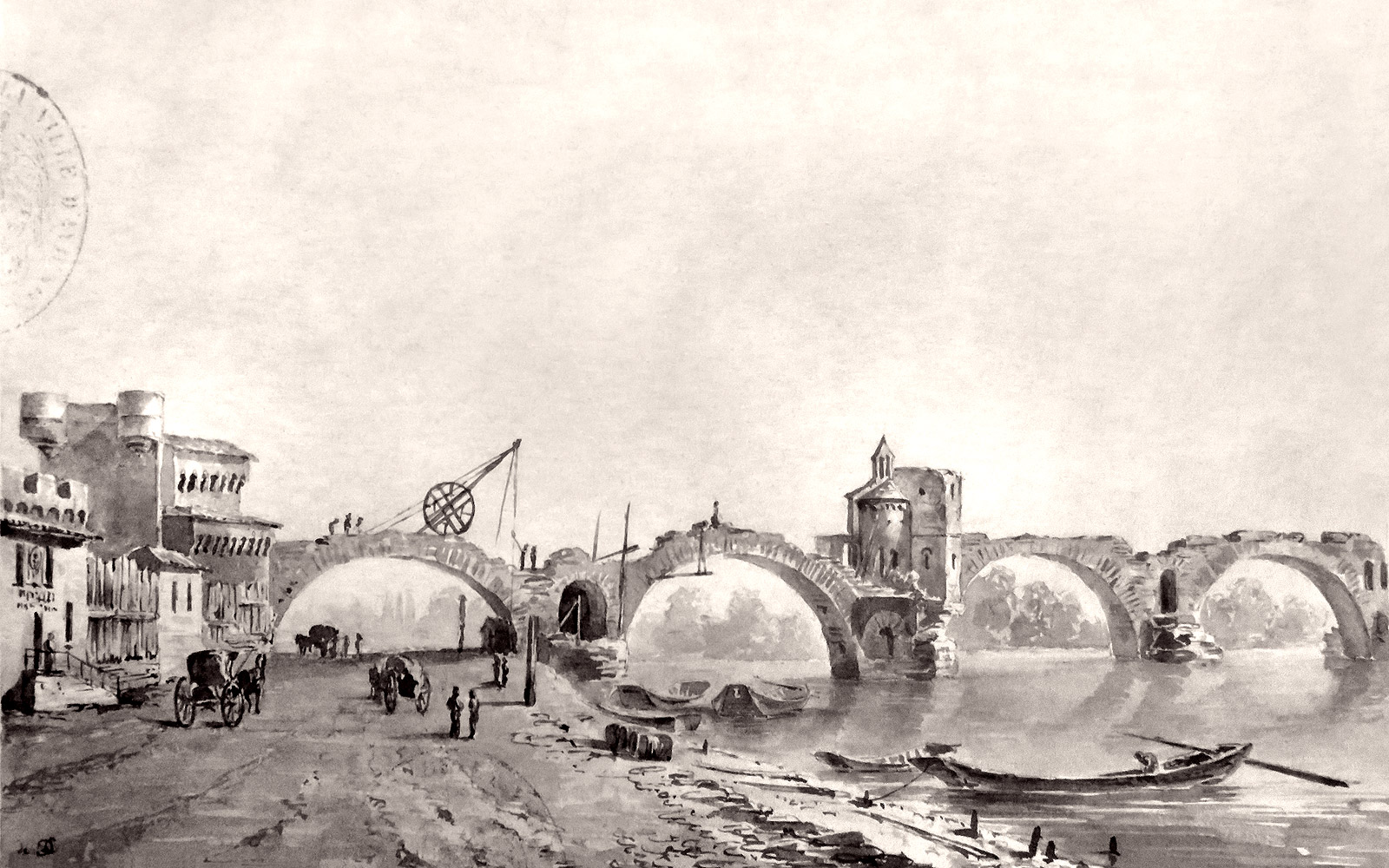
Restoration of the surviving arches, Hubert de Saint-Didier in 1824–1825

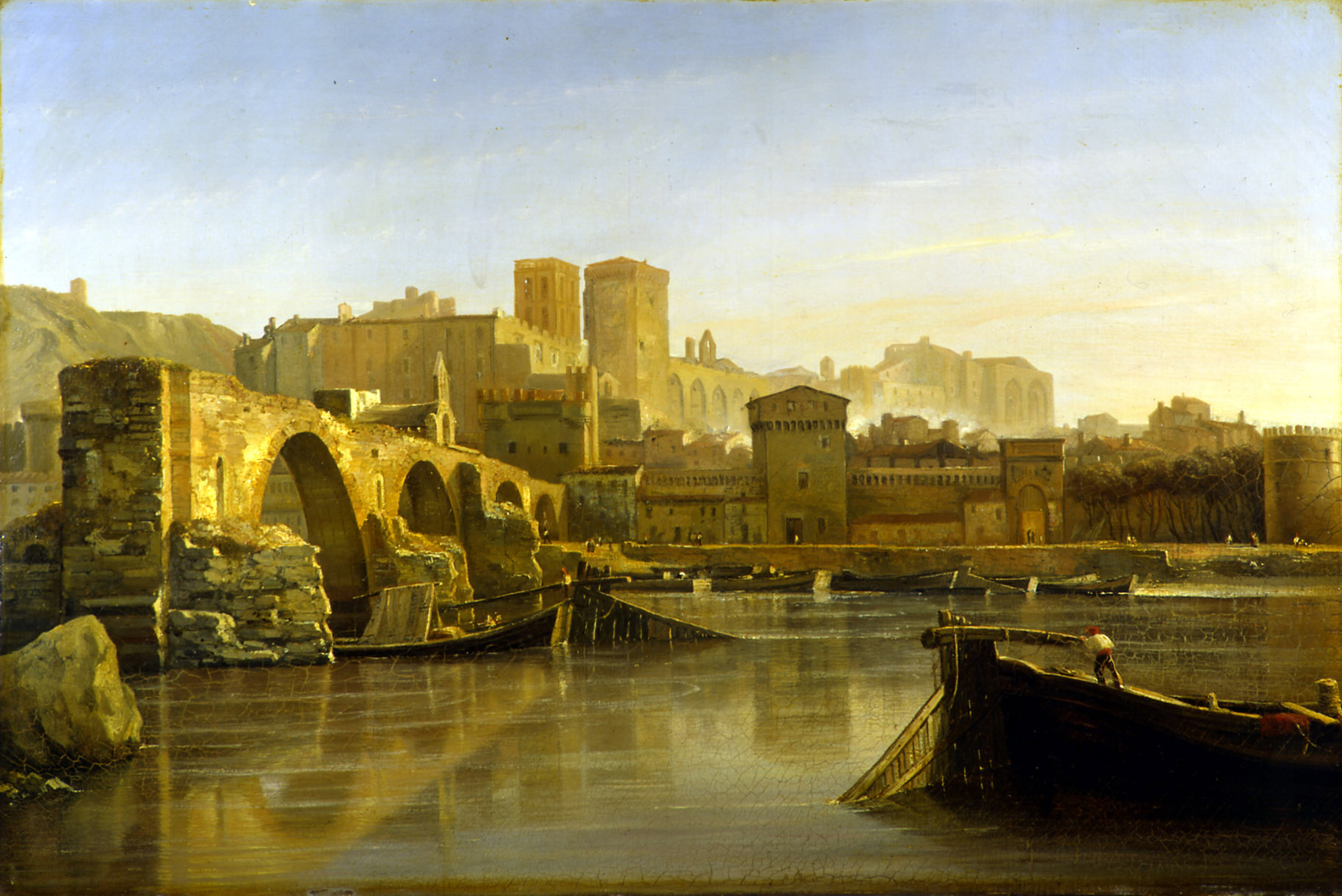
The four surviving arches depicted by Isidore Dagnan in 1833

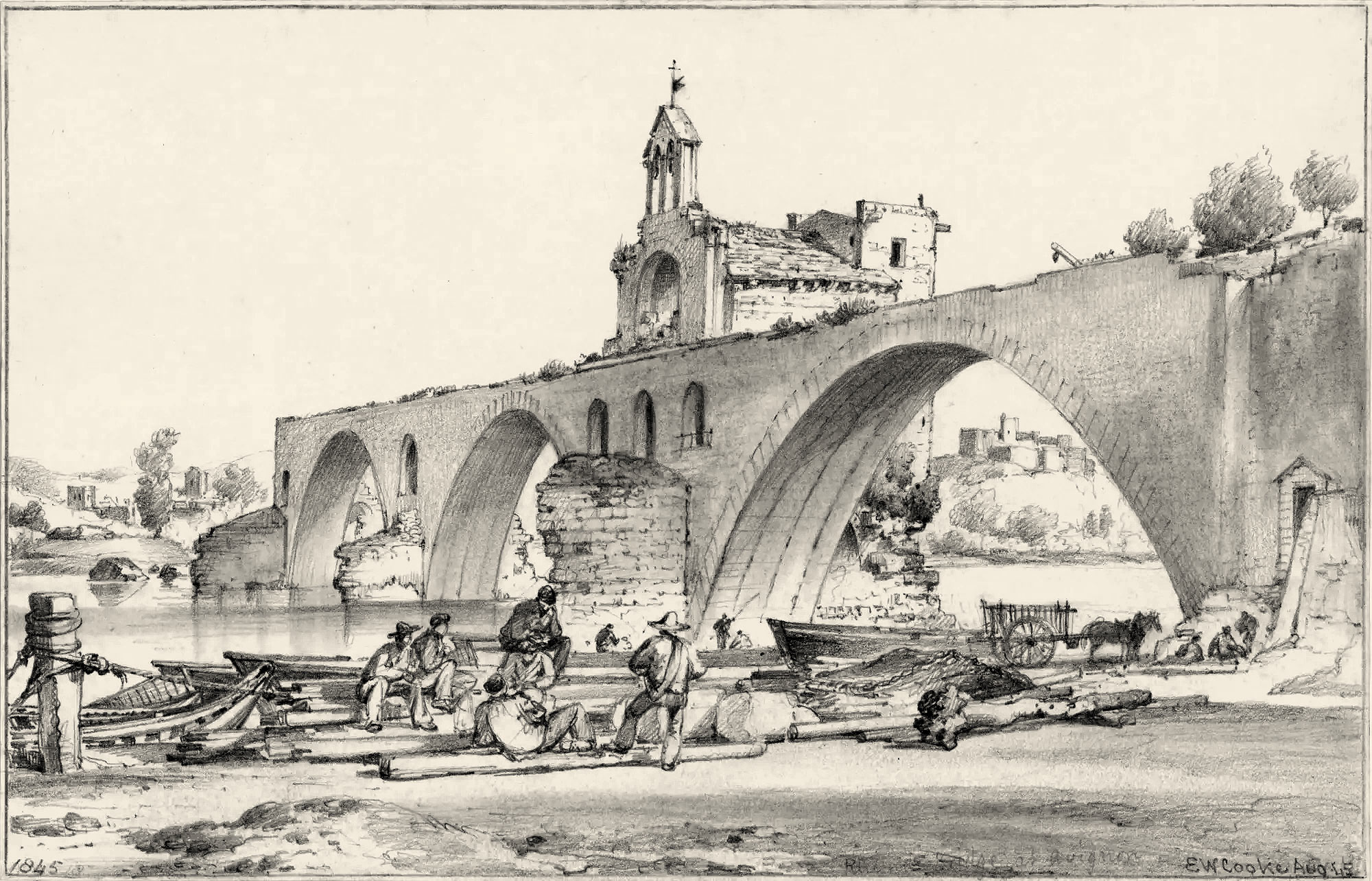
The four surviving arches drawn by Edward William Cooke in 1845

== See also ==
- List of bridges in France
- List of medieval bridges in France
- French Romanesque architecture

== Sources ==
- Anonymous (6 February 1853). "Théatre Impérial de l'Opéra-Comique, Le Sourd ou l'Auberge pleine: Comédie en trois actes de Desforges, mélée de musique par Ad. Adam". Revue et Gazette Musicale de Paris: Journal des Artistes, des Amateurs et des Théâtres (in French). 20 (6). Paris: 42.
- Bouette de Blémur, Jacqueline (1689). "La vie de Saint Benoist". Vies des Saints, Volume 2 (in French). Lyon, France: Pierre Valfray. pp. 111–113.
- Carru, Dominique (1999). "Le Rhône à Avignon. Données archéologiques". Gallia. 56: 109–120. doi:10.3406/galia.1999.3248.
- Carru, Dominique (2001). "Aux origines du mont Andaon: Villeneuve-lès-Avignon et sa proche région jusqu'au Moyen Âge". In Barruol, Guy; Bacou, Roseline; Girard, Alain (eds.). L'Abbaye Saint-André-lès-Avignon: histoire, archéologie, rayonnement (in French). Mane, Alpes-de-Haute-Provence, France: Alpes de Lumière. pp. 15–22. ISBN 978-2-906162-54-9.
- Champion, Maurice (1861). "Bassin du Rhône". Les inondations en France depuis le VIe siècle jusqu'a nos jours (Volume 3) (in French). Paris: V. Dalmont. pp. 185–232 (up to 1600).
- Champion, Maurice (1862). Les inondations en France depuis le VIe siècle jusqu'a nos jours (Volume 4) (in French). Paris: V. Dalmont.
- Coulon, Louis (1644). Les Riviéres de France Volume 2 (in French). Paris: Francois Clousier.
- Devic, C.; Vaissete, J., eds. (1879). Histoire générale de Languedoc. Volume 8. Toulouse: Edouard Privat.
- Ghilardi, M.; Sanderson, D.; Kinnaird, T.; Bicket, A.; Balossino, S.; Parisot, J.-C.; Hermitte, D.; Guibal, F.; Fleury, J. (2015). "Dating the bridge at Avignon (south France) and reconstructing the Rhone River fluvial palaeo-landscape in Provence from medieval to modern times". Journal of Archaeological Science: Reports. 4: 336–354. doi:10.1016/j.jasrep.2015.10.002.
- Girard, Joseph (1958). Évocation du Vieil Avignon (in French). Paris: Les Éditions de Minuit. OCLC 5391399.
- Labande, M. L.-H. (1910). "Pont Saint-Bénézet et Chapelle de Saint-Nicolas". Congrès archéologique de France, 76e session, 1909, Avignon. Volume 1 Guide du Congrès (in French). pp. 46–52.
- Maigret, Chantal (2002). "La tour Philippe le Bel 1303-2003: 700 ans d'histoire". Études Vauclusiennes (in French). 68: 5–22.
- Marié, Denis-Marcel (1953). Le pont Saint Bénézet. Étude historique et archéologique d'un ouvrage en partie disparu. Volume 1: Histoires et réalité (in French). Versailles: D.-M. Marié (self-published). No further volumes were published. The link provides the text of chapters 1, 7, 10–12.
- Mesqui, Jean (2000). "Pont Saint-Esprit: Pont sur le Rhône". Congrès archéologique de France - Monuments du Gard, 157e session 1999 (in French). Paris: Société française d'archéologie. pp. 521–523.
- Müntz, E. (1888). "L'antipape Clément VII: Essai sur l'histoire des arts à Avignon vers la fin du XIVe siècle (suite)". Revue Archéologique. 3rd series (in French). 11 (2): 168–183.
- Pansier, Pierre (1930). "La Tour du Pont d'Avignon" (PDF). Annales d'Avignon et du Comtat Venaissin (in French). 16: 5–19.
- Pastoret, Claude-Emmanuel de, ed. (1828). Ordonnances des rois de France de la troisième race (in French). Vol. 18. Paris: L'Imprimerie Royale.
- Perrot, Roger; Granier, Jacques; Gagnière, Sylvain (1971). "Contribution à l'étude du pont Saint-Bénézet". Mémoires de l'Académie de Vaucluse. 6th ser. (in French). 5: 67–93.
- Rochetin, L. (1892). "Archéologie Vauclusienne: Avignon dans l'Antiquité". Mémoire de l'Académie de Vaucluse (in French). 11: 187–212, 269–312.
- Rochetin, L. (1893). "Additions et Corrections: Avignon dans l'Antiquité". Mémoire de l'Académie de Vaucluse (in French). 12: 240–243.
- Rouquette, Jean-Maurice (1974). Provence Romane: La Provence Rhodanienne (in French, English, and German). Paris: Zodiaque. OCLC 1036957.
- Sagnier, A. (1883). "Le Pont de Saint-Bénézet". Congrès archéologique de France, 49e session 1882, Séances Générales, Avignon (in French). pp. 259–282 (misnumbered from 272).
- Schäfer, Karl Heinrich, ed. (1914). Die ausgaben der Apostolischen kammer unter Benedikt XII, Klemens VI und Innocenz VI (1335–1362) (in German and Latin). Paderborn, Germany: F. Schöningh.
- Vella, Marc-Antoine; et al. (2013). "Géoarchéologie du Rhône dans le secteur du pont Saint-Bénézet (Avignon, Provence, France) au cours de la seconde moitié du deuxième millénaire apr. J.-C.: étude croisée de géographie historique et des paléoenvironnements". Géomorphologie: Relief, Processus, Environnement (in French and English). 3: 287–310. doi:10.4000/geomorphologie.10300.
- Viollet-le-Duc, Eugène (1875). Dictionnaire raisonné de l'architecture française du XIe au XVIe siècle Volume 7 (in French). Paris: A. Morel.
- Woetmann Christoffersen, Peter (1994). French Music in the Early Sixteenth Century. Volume II Catalogue. Copenhagen: Museum Tusculanum Press. OCLC 32069293.
