= Tour Philippe-le-Bel =

French fortress castle

- Villeneuve-lès-Avignon, Gard, France
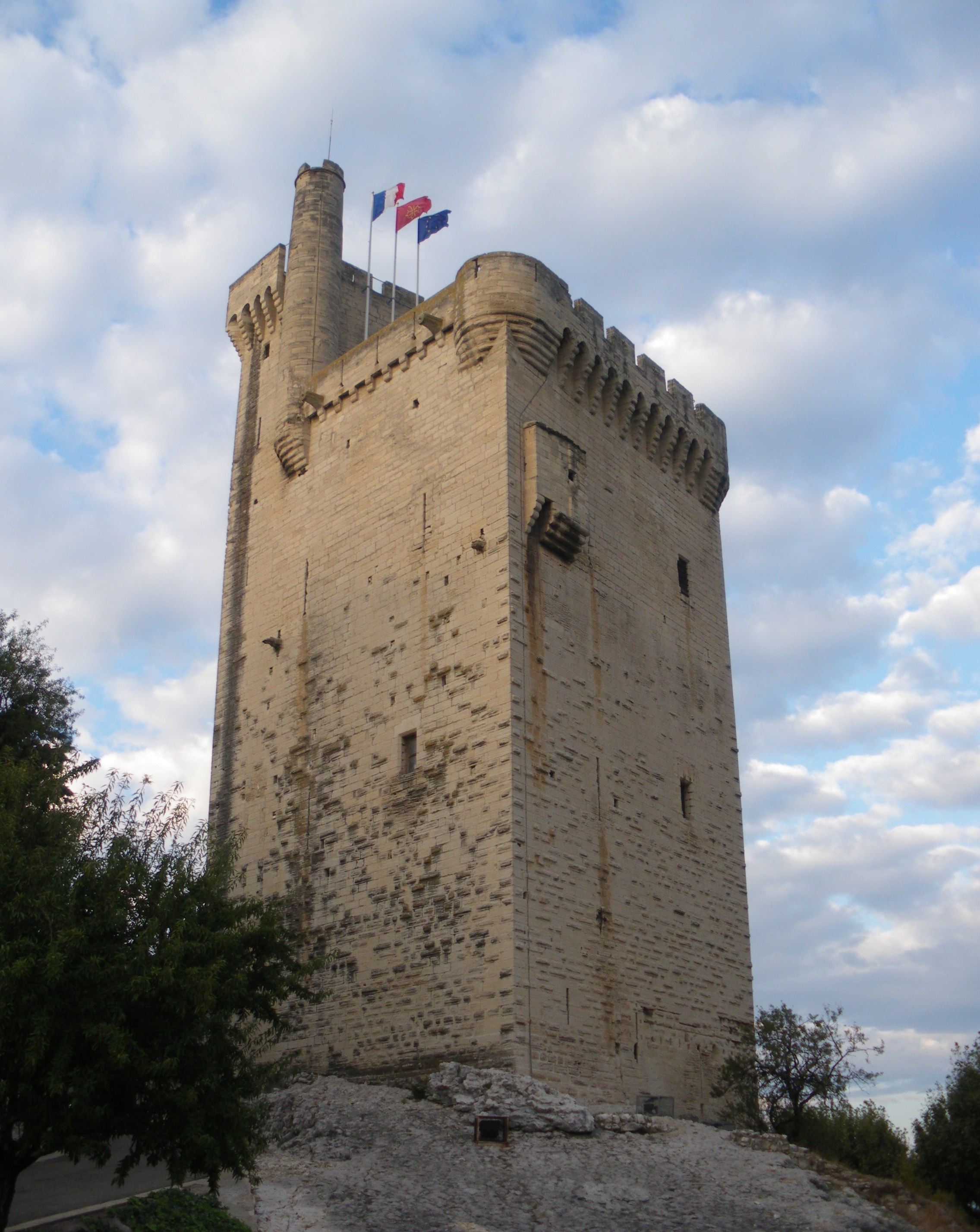
- View of the tower from the southwest.

Site information
- Owner: Commune of Villeneuve-lès-Avignon
- Open to the public: Yes
- Condition: Preserved

Location
- Location within France
- Coordinates: 43°57′31″N 4°47′51″E

Site history
- Built: c.1292-1303
- Built by: Philip IV of France

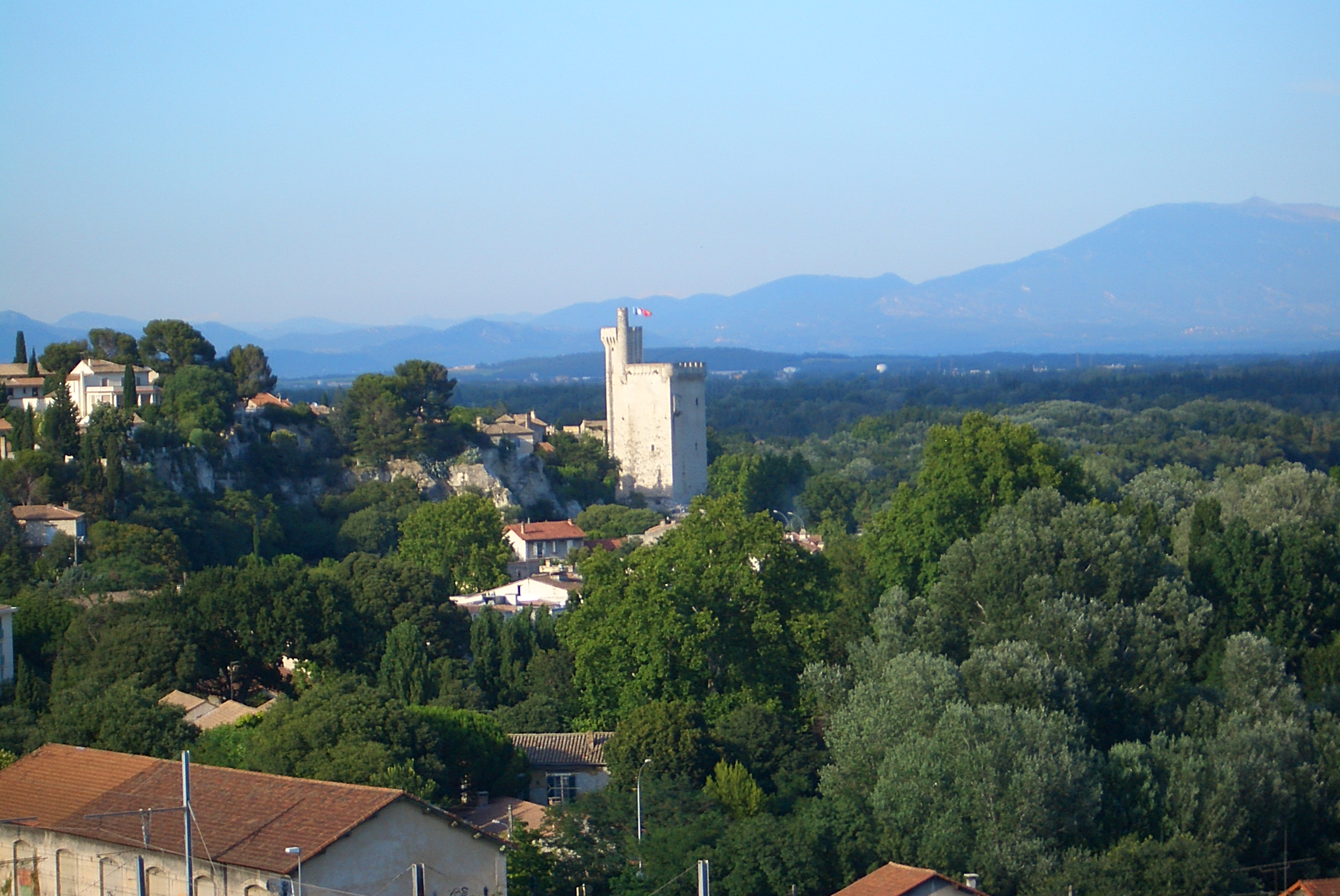
Tower of Philip the Fair among its surroundings

Tour Philippe-le-Bel (English: Tower of Philip the Fair) is a medieval tower in Villeneuve-lès-Avignon which marked the French terminus of the Saint-Bénézet Bridge across the Rhone between the Kingdom of France and Papal territory of Avignon. It is named after the French king Philippe-le-Bel (Philip IV "the Fair") who was responsible for its construction.

A tower with only two storeys was completed in 1302. In spite of protests from the Count of Provence and the population of Avignon, Philippe-le-Bel pressed ahead and built a gatehouse at the end of the bridge. The tower and gatehouse formed part of a fortress with a curtain wall that enclosed several buildings including a chapel and a residence for the châtelain. A third storey was added to the tower in the middle of the 14th century.

The Saint-Bénézet Bridge was abandoned in 1669 and the fortress then ceased to serve any useful function. The French crown continued to pay for repairs, but after the French Revolution the buildings were abandoned and allowed to fall into ruins. In 1822 the town of Villeneuve-lès-Avignon decided to demolish all of the fortress except the present tower. It was listed as a Monument historique in 1862 and is now open to the public.

== History ==
=== Background ===
The treaty of Meaux-Paris, signed in 1229 at the end of the Albigensian Crusade, handed the French crown land on the right bank of the Rhône from Pont-Saint-Esprit to the Mediterranean and a joint interest in the city of Avignon. In 1290 the French king, Philip IV (Philip the Fair), ceded his claim to Avignon to his father's cousin, Charles II of Naples who was the Count of Provence through his marriage to Beatrice of Provence. As a consequence Philip gave up his share of the strategic Saint-Bénézet Bridge across the Rhone which had been built between 1177 and 1185 by the city of Avignon.

The Languedoc end of the bridge was within a kilometer of the Benedictine Abbey of Saint-André on Mount Andaon. The abbey had been founded at the end of the 10th century and possessed extensive property with over 200 churches spread over a wide area of southern France. In 1290 Philip IV instructed Adam de Montcéliard, the sénéchal of Beaucaire, to negotiate an agreement with the abbey to cooperate in the defense of the right bank of the Rhone. The paréage treaty was signed in 1292. It meant that the abbey surrendered temporal power but obtained protection from the unwanted pressure from the city of Avignon which wished to control both banks of the Rhône.

=== Construction ===
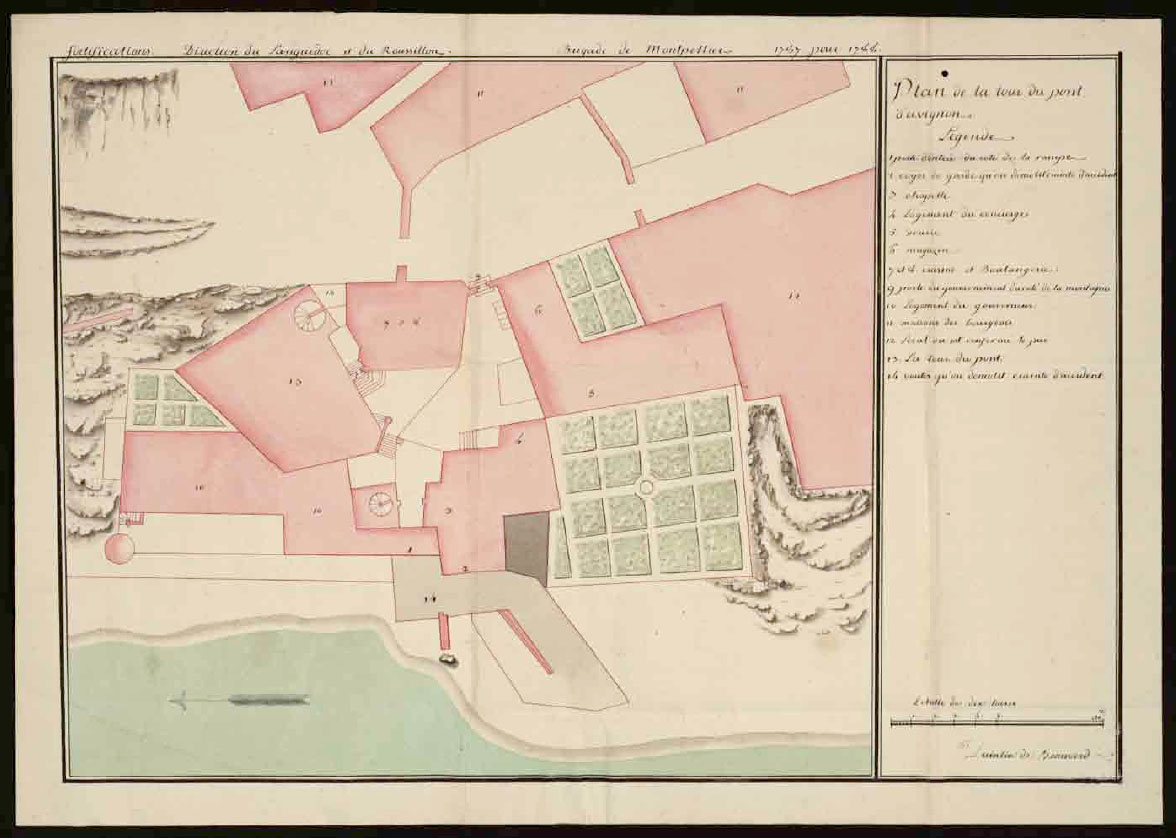
Plan of the tower and surrounding buildings by Quintin de Beuverd, 1787

The 1292 treaty specified that the king could construct a fortress at the western end of the bridge. By 1302, a two-storey fortified tower had been completed. This initial construction work almost certainly included the building of a curtain-wall, a well, a bread oven, a kitchen and some form of lodging for the châtelain and the guards.

Charles II, Count of Provence objected to the position of the new fortress and wrote letters protesting that the foundations of the tower were right next to the bridge which was built on his property. In spite of his objections, in 1307 work began on the construction of a gatehouse over the roadway at the end of the bridge. This provoked strong opposition by the inhabitants of Avignon who occupied the tower. Eventually, 9 months later in August 1308 a peaceful settlement was reached allowing the gatehouse to be completed. In March of the following year (1309), Pope Clement V moved from Rome to Avignon.

The fortress was overlooked by the nearby Massif des Anges and the Colline des Mourgues making it difficult to defend. Around 1350, during the reign of either Philip VI or his successor John II, an additional storey was added to the tower with a rectangular turret on the top. The tower was crowned with machicolations. A narrow cylindrical watchtower was added at a later date, perhaps in the 16th century.

During the period of the Avignon Papacy the fortress saw much activity with high ranking church officials, princes and notables crossing the bridge. Between 1320 and 1350 several cardinals built palaces in Villeneuve, across the bridge from the papal palace in Avignon. (Note: Cardinal Napoleone Orsini (1263-1342) had a palace built on the Rocher de Saluces immediately to the north of the fortress. Some of the walls and parts of the palace have survived.) On a number of occasions sections of the bridge were destroyed when the Rhône flooded. The bridge then became impassable and the river had to be crossed by ferry. The harbour on the right bank was at the base of the tower. Eighteenth century drawings show that access to both the fortress and the harbour was controlled by gates on the path leading up from the river bank along what is now the Montée de la Tour.

When the Avignon bridge was finally abandoned in 1669, the fortress no longer served any useful function. It was nevertheless still maintained but in 1777 a government engineer wrote a short report proposing that the fortress be abandoned. Probably, as a result, in 1787, Quintin de Beuverd, captain of the Corps Royal du Génie, produced a detailed report on the state of the buildings. It included a plan and concluded that the buildings were not required by the king. These events were overtaken by the French Revolution in 1789 but the surviving documents allow historians to study the layout of the fortress.

=== Neglect and partial demolition ===
With the Revolution the fortress became national property and was no longer maintained. In 1804 the fortress was ceded to the hospice d'Uzès as compensation for other property that had been confiscated and sold. Although the hospice had no interest in the monument, in 1808 the Gard préfecture refused to allow it to be put up for sale and as a result the monument became a ruin and was vandalised. A hole in the wall of the tower was used to anchor the chain ferry that carried passengers across the Rhone. From 1821 the commune of Villeneuve rented the monument from the hospice until finally in 1842 the French king, Louis Philippe I, signed a bill authorising the commune to acquire the tower and its dependencies.

From 1821 the town of Villeneuve had effective control of the monument without actually owning it, but instead of repairing the buildings, the town claimed that the ruined structures around the tower posed a hazard and in 1822 ordered them to be demolished and the material sold to cover the costs. In 1834 part of the limestone rock around tower was cut away to create a new access route to the port on the Rhône. Some of the stone was used to construct the quay, the rest was supplied to lime kilns. The tower is now the only part of the medieval fortress that survives. The construction of roads and a car-park have obliterated almost all traces of the surrounding buildings, but fortunately, the many documents and pictures that survive in the archives can be used to study the details of the original structure.

The tower was listed as a Monument historique in 1862.

== Surviving tower ==
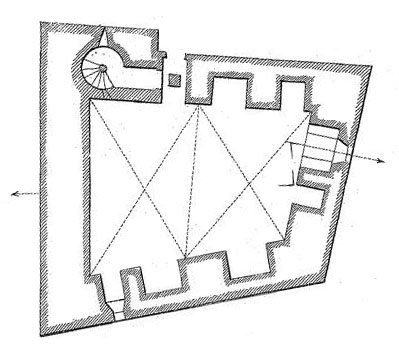
A plan of the ground-floor. The western wall is 16 m (52 ft) in length.

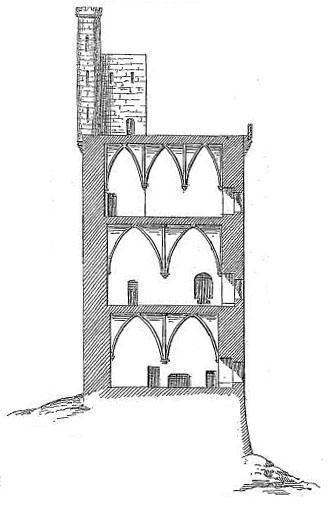
A cross-section of the tower looking north. The structure has an overall height of 39 m (128 ft).

The tower is the only surviving element of the original fortress. It sits on a sloping rocky base and has an irregular quadrilateral plan with average dimensions of 13.4 by 15.7 m (44 by 52 ft). It is built of limestone blocks that would have been brought by boat from a quarry near the base of Fort Saint-André. (Note: The tow-path along the right bank of the river was constructed at the end of the 17th century.) The exterior walls of the ground floor and most of the first floor are constructed using rusticated ashlar (bossage).

There are three floors with a single large room on each floor. The ceilings are 7.5 m (25 ft) in height. The floors are connected by a well-conserved narrow spiral staircase only 1 m (3 ft 3 in) in width located in the northwest corner of the building. The stairs are protected at the top by a rectangular turret. On the first two levels of the staircase there are slots in the external wall to admit light. The roof terrace is 27 m (89 ft) above the ground. The turret projects another 7 m (23 ft) and the lookout tower extends a further 5 m (16 ft) giving a total height of 39 m (128 ft) for the structure. The walls are 2.4 m (7 ft 10 in) in thickness on the ground floor, 2.2 m (7 ft 3 in) on the first floor and 2.0 m (6 ft 7 in) on the second.

The tower has been subject to a series of modifications over the centuries. The lower two floors were completed by 1302 while the third floor was added in around 1350. The watchtower was added in the 15th or 16th century, and in the 18th century some of the openings were blocked up. In addition, some changes were made during restoration work in the 20th century. Areas of protruding stonework on the north and east sides the tower appear to be the remains of the bonding of a defensive curtain wall. On the east side there is a doorway that may have provided access to a walkway along the top of the wall, while on the north side a similar doorway has been blocked up, presumably at an early date, and fitted with an arrowslit. There is no evidence that a curtain wall at these positions was ever actually constructed and it is possible that the wall formed part of an original plan that was never realized. On the west wall of the tower there are two blocked doorways connecting to the spiral staircase. These are likely to have been used to access garderobes (latrines).

On the east face of the tower there are three carved crests under a hood mould. Although they are not clearly interpretable, the upper two are almost certainly those of the king of France and the Abbey of Saint-André. The third crest, which has what appears to be an oblique row of three roses, is probably that of Pope Clement VI who purchased the town of Avignon from Joanna I of Naples in 1348.

=== Ground floor ===
The ground floor of the tower was probably occupied by the guards. There is a small entrance on the north side which is protected by the bretèche on the exterior and a murder-hole above the entrance passage. (Note: The main entrance to the tower is only 1 m (3 ft 3 in) in width by 2 m (6 ft 7 in) in height.) The room has a ribbed quadripartite vault in two bays springing from corbels. The corbels are undecorated but the two ceiling bosses are carved with rosettes of acanthus leaves. The room is lit by six openings, four of which are placed in niches provided with stone benches. (Note: The niches measure 3.2 m (10 ft) in height and 1.98 m (6 ft 6 in) in width.) The only window is in a niche in the east wall and would have provided a view towards the bridge. (Note: The window is 1.32 m × 1.04 m (4 ft 4 in × 3 ft 5 in).) The five other openings are arrowslits. A large recessed fireplace has a chimney which is completely contained within the thickness of the north wall. In the summer it would have been closed off by thick wooden shutters.

Some of the walls have traces of wall paintings. Above the fireplace there is the outline of a man's head in bright colours that must have once formed part of a larger design. In two of the arched niches, and also barely visible on the west wall, there is an interlocking hexagonal pattern in red ochre lines that is decorated with foliage curling around a large rose with five petals. The design is similar to that used to decorate the interior of several other building in the area that date from the same period.

=== First floor ===
The high quality of the carving in the first floor room indicates that it was designed to serve as the main reception area. The rib vaulting is divided into two bays as on the ground floor but the six corbels and the ceiling bosses are decorated with finely carved busts or foliage. The room is lit by six openings set in niches. Of these four are windows and only two are arrowslits. The fireplace is set into the west wall.

There is a second entrance with modest dimensions in the east wall. (Note: The first floor doorway in the east wall measures 1.98 by 0.95 m (6 ft 6 in by 3 ft 1 in).) On the outside of the building the doorway is positioned above some projecting stonework that may have been intended as the bonding to a curtain wall that was never built. The entrance was perhaps originally served by a wooden staircase but when the gatehouse was constructed it gave direct access to the châtelain's residence. The doorway and four of the niches were blocked at the beginning of the 18th century when the two upper floors of the tower was used as a prison. They were unblocked as part of the restoration work carried out in the 1970s. (Note: The blocked niches are indicated in Figure 6 of the 1879 publication by Duhamel.)

=== Second floor ===
When the second floor was added to the tower in the middle of the 14th century, the sloping ridged roof of the earlier terrace was retained and became the floor of the new room. The rib vaulting is divided into three bays instead of two as on the lower two floors. The carved corbels and ceiling bosses are less skilful executed that those on the first floor. The room was originally lit by openings in six niches of which two were windows and four were arrowslits. Those with arrowslits were blocked when the tower was used as a prison and have not been reopened. The arches of the niches differ from those on the lower floors; they have an ogive shape rather than a semi-circular form. The fireplace is set into the north wall. There is an entrance to a garderobe in the southwest corner of the room. The position is surprising as it would have been almost above the quarters of the châtelain and it is possible that the structure was originally a bartizan which was converted into a garderobe when the upper floors were used as a prison.

=== Terrace ===
Three sides of the terrace have machicolations with a parapet supported on large corbels. At the corners there are semi-cylindrical corbelled turrets (bartizans) to allow the defenders to observe the sides of the tower. The crenellation of the parapet dates from the restoration work carried out in the 1980s.

The tower is owned by the commune of Villeneuve-lès-Avignon and is open to the public. The room on the ground floor is used to hold art exhibitions. The first floor room houses an exhibition on the history of the Tour Philippe-le-Bel and the Pont Saint-Bénézet.

== Pictorial record ==
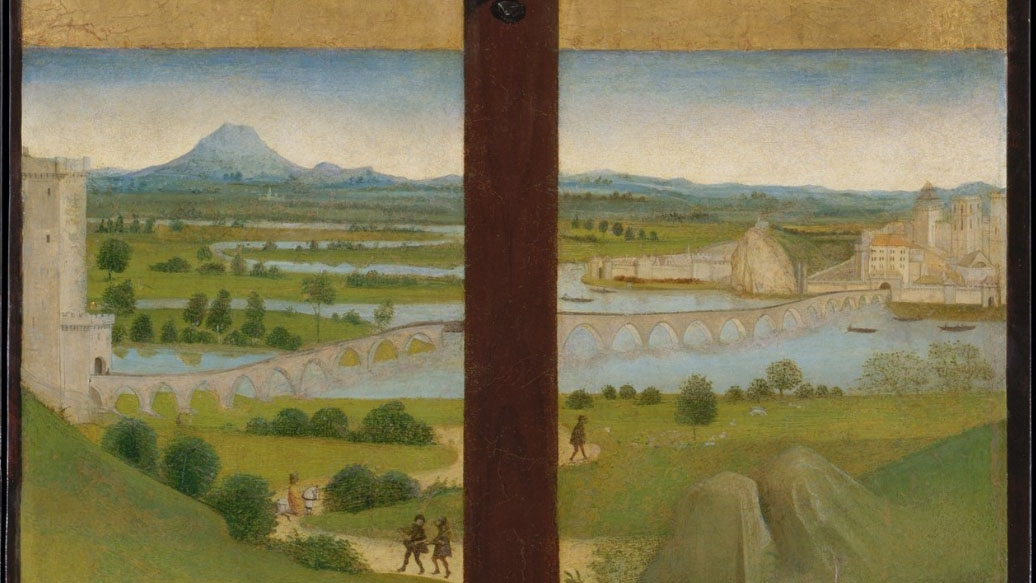
Detail from the Pérussis Altarpiece showing the Saint-Bénézet Bridge with the Tour Philippe-le-Bel on the left, 1480

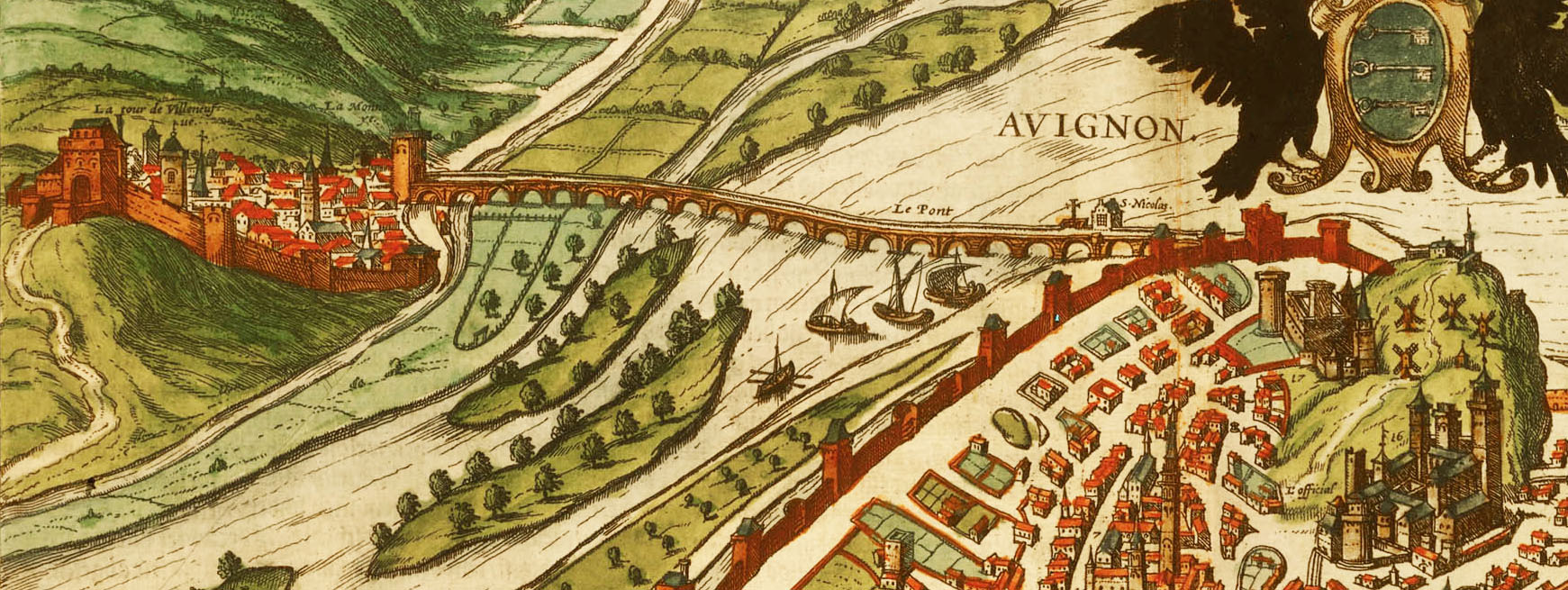
Detail from an engraving by Georg Braun, 1575

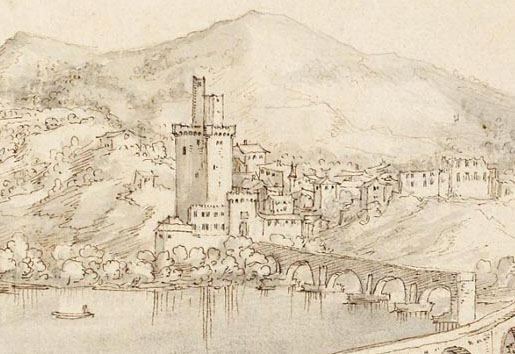
Detail from a drawing by Étienne Martellange, 1608

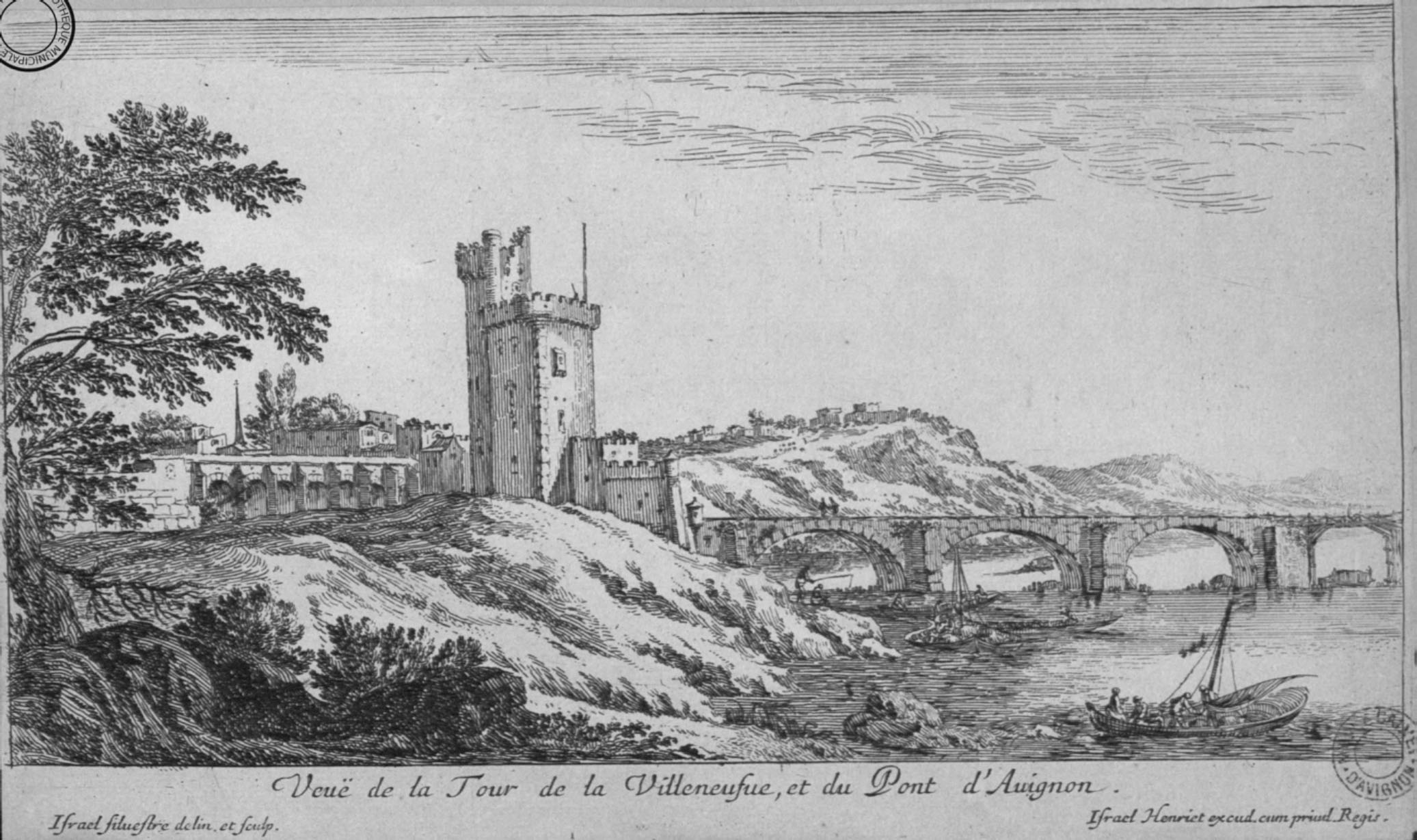
Engraving by Israel Silvestre, c. 1660

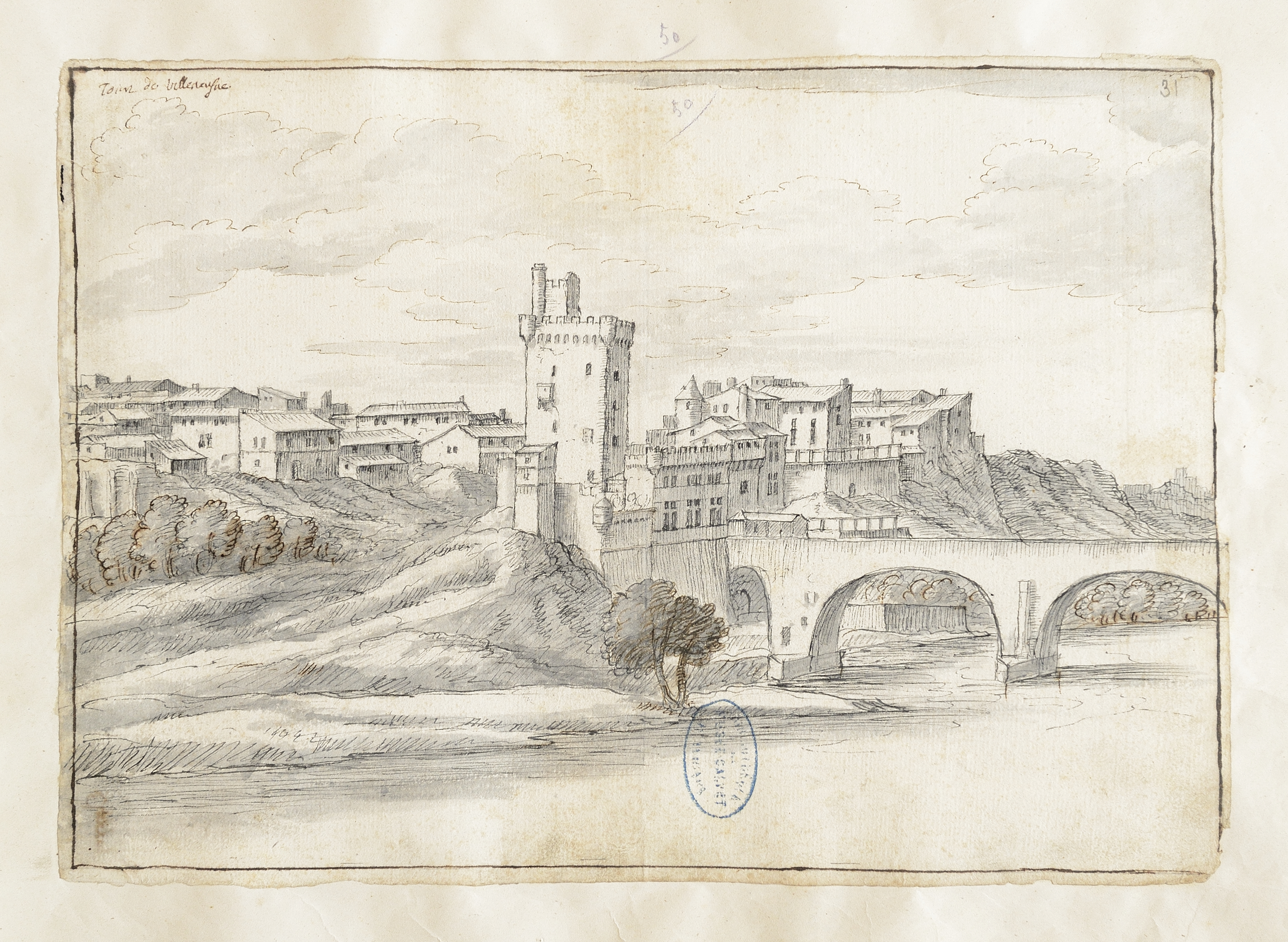
Drawing from the Album Laincel, c. 1670

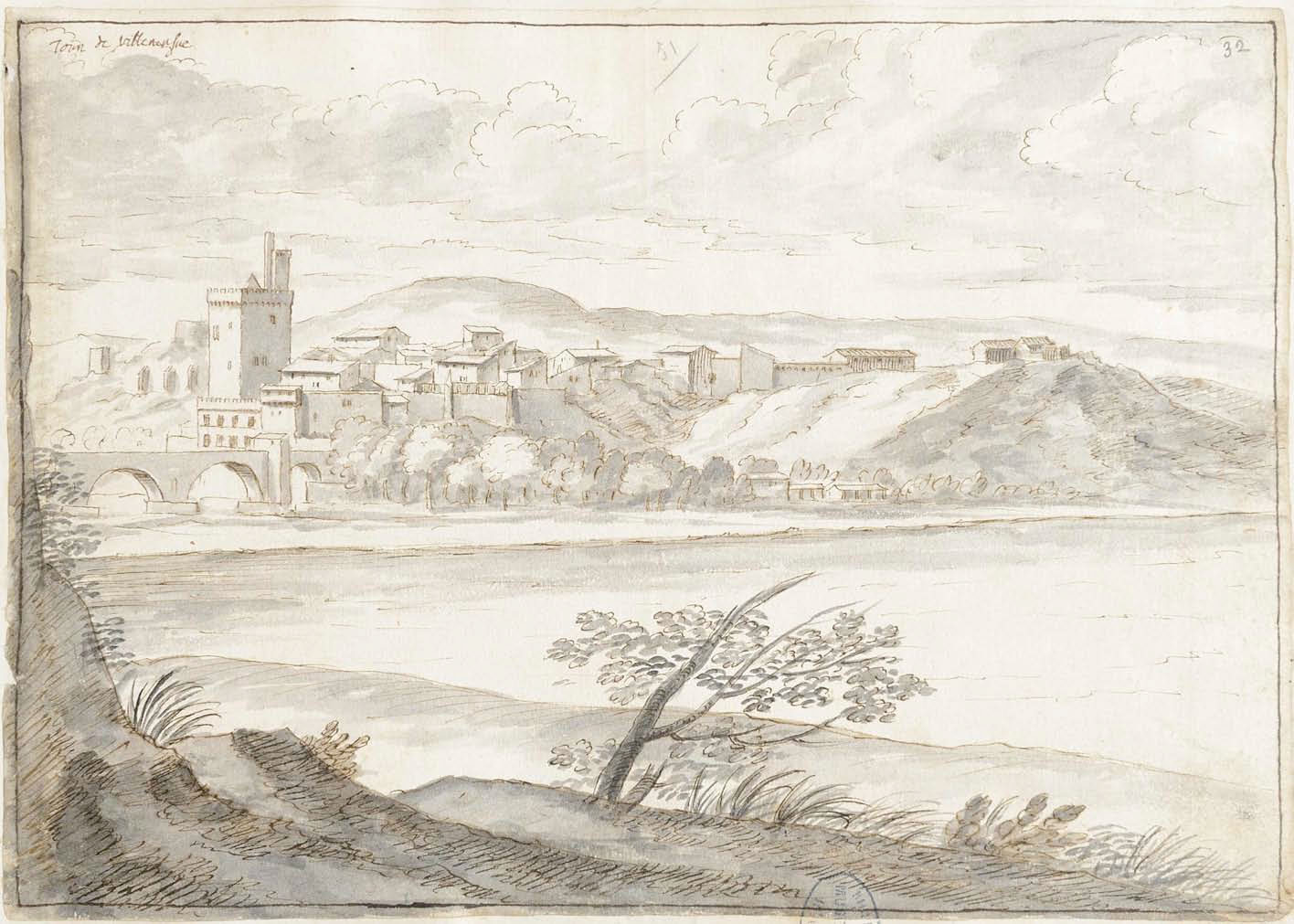
Drawing from the Album Laincel, c. 1670

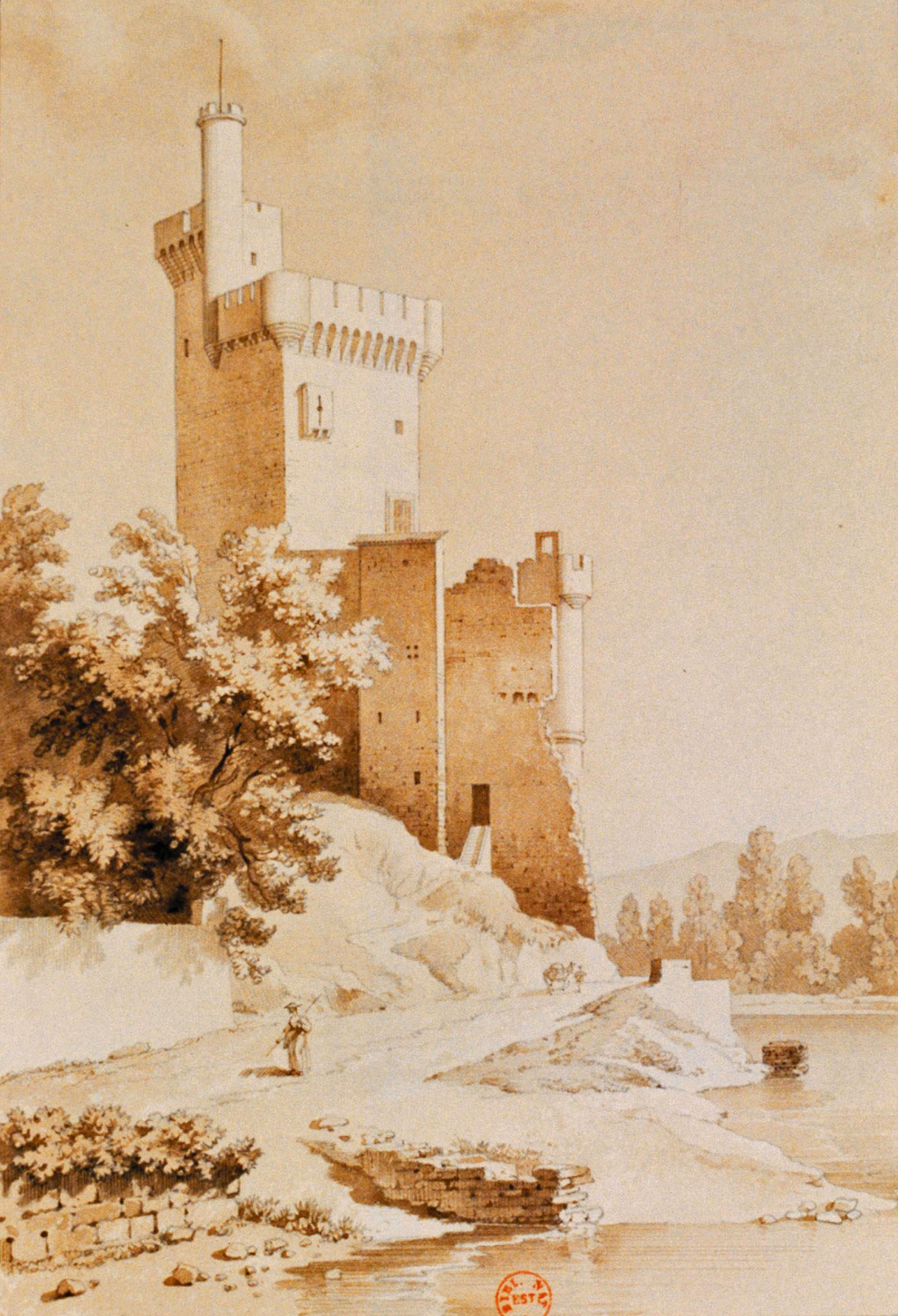
Drawing by Théodore Caruelle d'Aligny, 1856 (Note: The year of 1856 is given in the drawing's legend. This may be incorrect as according to Maigret (2002) the buildings had been demolished by this date.)

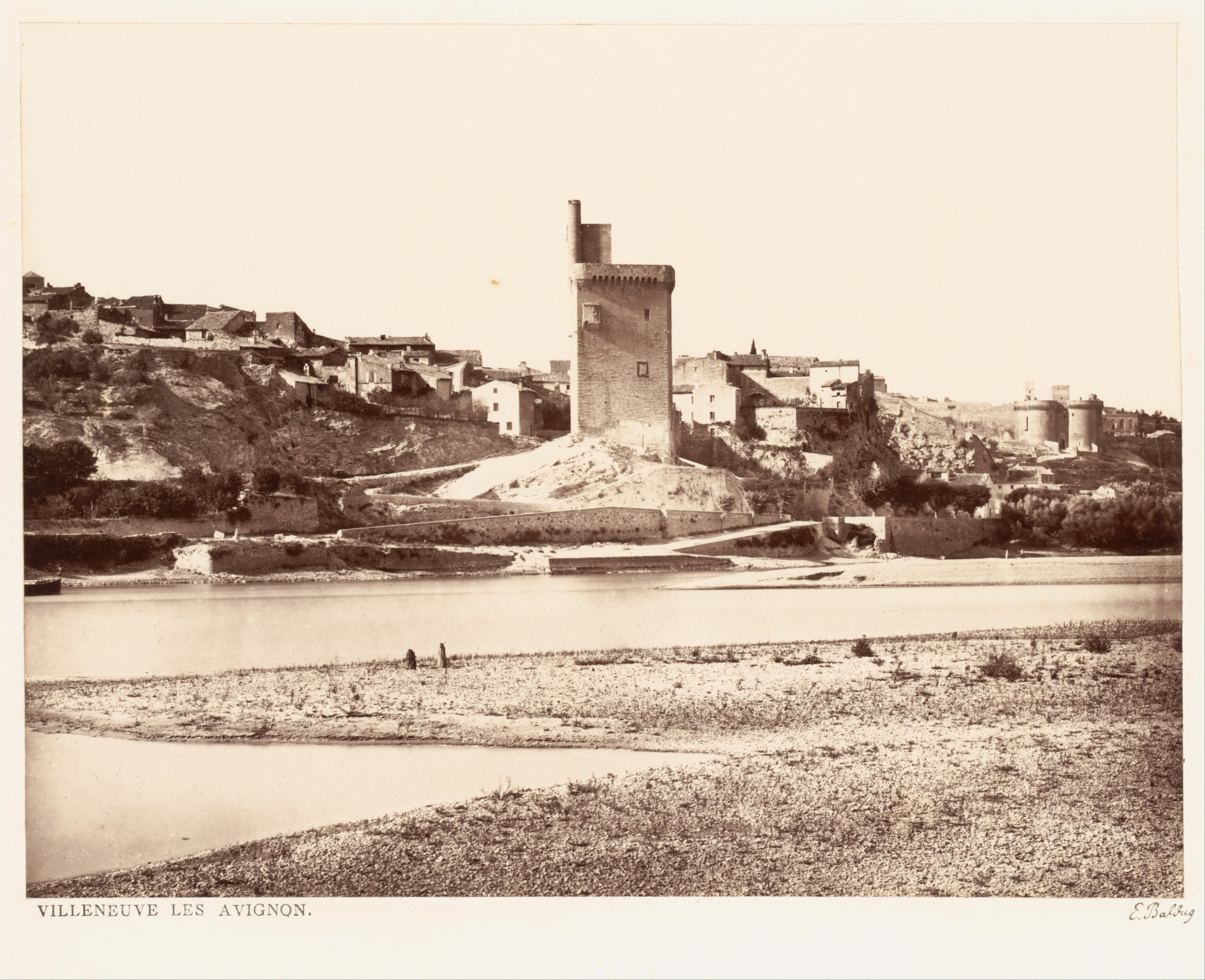
Photograph by Édouard Baldus c. 1862. The buildings associated with the tower had been demolished.

== See also ==
- Fort Saint-André, a castle less than 1 km (0.62 mi) north of the tower.

== Sources ==
- Barruol, Guy (2001), "Le temporel de l'abbaye Saint-André au haut Moyen Âge", in Barruol, Guy; Bacou, Roseline; Girard, Alain (eds.), L'Abbaye Saint-André-lès-Avignon: histoire, archéologie, rayonnement (in French), Mane, Alpes-de-Haute-Provence, France: Alpes de Lumière, pp. 209–233, ISBN 978-2-906162-54-9.
- Duhamel, P. (1879), "La Tour de Philippe le Bel à Villeneuve-les-Avignon", Bulletin Historique et Archéologique de Vaucluse (in French), 1: Part 1 pp. 81–87 (Issue 2), Part 2 pp. 127–132 (Issue 3), Part 3 pp. 170–175 (Issue 4), Part 4 pp. 291–305 (Issue 7), Pièces Justificatives (7) pp. 306–313 (Issue 4). A scan of the article is also available from the Internet Archive without the figures.
- Falque, Maurice (1908), Étude des procès et contestations sur la propriété du Rhône et de la ville d'Avignon, 1302-1818 (Doctoral Thesis) (in French and Latin), Montpellier: Société anonyme de l'imprimerie générale du Midi.
- Faucherre, Nicolas; Sournia, Bernard (2013), Rapport d'opérations archéologiques à la tour Philippe le Bel de Villeneuve-lès-Avignon du 7 au 9 décembre 2012 et du 9 au 10 mars 2013 (PDF), Modèles et simulations pour l'architecture et le patrimoine, Centre National de la Research Scientifique/Ministère de la Culture et de la Communication.
- Maigret, Chantal (2002), "La tour Philippe le Bel 1303-2003: 700 ans d'histoire", Études Vauclusiennes (in French), 68: 5–22.
- Ménard, M. (1744), Histoire civile, ecclésiastique, et littéraire de la ville de Nismes, avec les preuves (Volume 1) (in French and Latin), Paris: Hugues-Daniel Chaubert.
- Payan, Paul (2001), "L'abbaye Saint-André à la rencontre des pouvoirs. Un enjeu stratégique entre France et Avignon (XIIIe–XIVe siècles)", in Barruol, Guy; Bacou, Roseline; Girard, Alain (eds.), L'Abbaye Saint-André-lès-Avignon: histoire, archéologie, rayonnement (in French), Mane, Alpes-de-Haute-Provence, France: Alpes de Lumière, pp. 155–160, ISBN 978-2-906162-54-9.
