= Fort Saint-André (Villeneuve-lès-Avignon) =

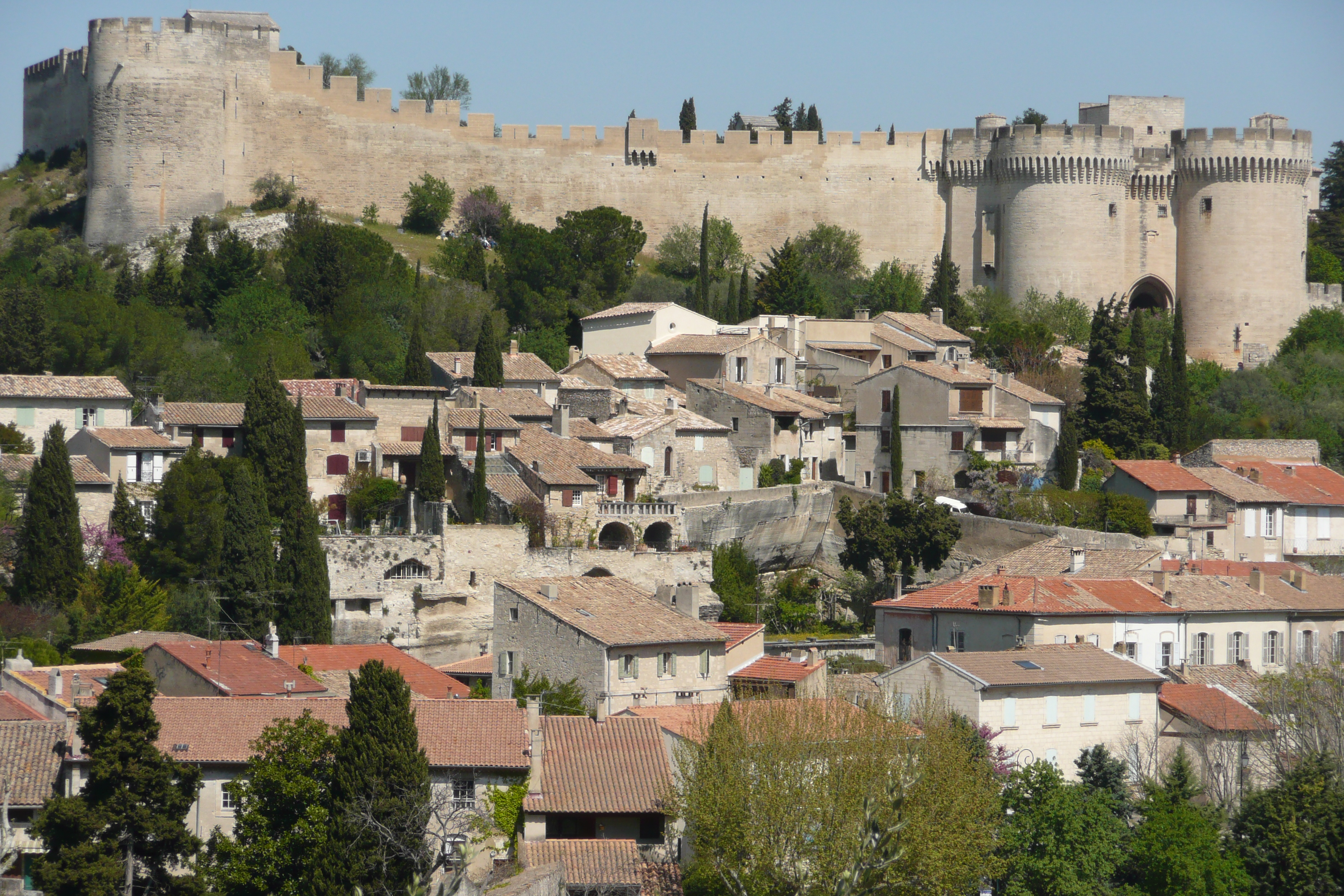
- View to the Fort Saint-André over the town of Villeneuve

- Location within France
- 43°57′57″N 4°48′3″E
- Location: Villeneuve-lès-Avignon, Gard, France

History
- Built: 14th century

Site notes
- Area: 3.5 ha (8.6 acres)
- Owner: Centre des monuments nationaux

Monument historique
- Official name: Fort Saint-André (ancien château)
- Designated: 1903, 1925
- Reference no.: PA00103306

The Fort Saint-André is a medieval fortress in the commune of Villeneuve-lès-Avignon in the Gard département of France, dating from the first half of the 14th century.

== History ==
The treaty of Paris, signed in 1229 at the end of the Albigensian Crusade, handed the French crown land to the west of the Rhone from Pont-Saint-Esprit to the Mediterranean and a joint interest in the city of Avignon. In 1290 the French king, Philip IV (Philippe-le-Bel or Philip the Fair), ceded his claim to Avignon to his father's cousin, Charles II of Naples who was the Count of Provence through his marriage to Beatrice of Provence.

The Benedictine Abbey of Saint-André occupied a strategic position on Mount Andaon within sight of the town of Avignon which lay on the other side of the Rhone. Mount Andaon is a rocky outcrop with steep sides to the north and the east that rises 50 m above the floodplain of the Rhone. Prior to the 1770s the river flowed next to the base of the eastern side of the mount. The plateau at the top covers an area of around 3.5 hectare and extends for 220 m in an east–west direction and 160 m north–south. The top is not flat but rises from south to north by 24 m. The abbey was built at the eastern end of the plateau; the western end was occupied by a small village.

The abbey had been founded at the end of the 10th century and possessed extensive property with over 200 churches spread over a wide area of southern France. In 1290 Philip IV instructed Adam de Montcéliard, the sénéchal of Beaucaire, to negotiate an agreement with the abbey to cooperate in the defense of the right bank of the Rhone. The paréage treaty signed in 1292 specified that Philippe le Bel could build a fortress with a permanent garrison next to the abbey and a castle by the river. The abbey surrendered temporal power but obtained protection from the unwanted pressure from the city of Avignon which wished to control both banks of the Rhone. By 1302 fortifications, including an initial Tour Philippe-le-Bel, had been built at the western end of the Pont Saint-Bénézet which lay less than kilometer from the abbey. In 1309, Pope Clement V moved the papacy from Rome to Avignon.

The fortress of Saint-André, with the curtain wall that surrounded the abbey, was built in several stages during the first half of the 14th century. The surviving manuscripts do not allow the construction to be precisely dated. A châtelain is mentioned in documents dating from 1314 and 1344, a guard is mentioned in 1318. The carved crest placed by the abbey above the entrance is dated 20 July 1367. This was probably when modifications were made to the entrance arch. The fortress was continually occupied by officers of the crown up to the time of French revolution.

The fortress was clearly visible from Papal State across the Rhone in the town of Avignon and was intended to demonstrate the power of the Kingdom of France.

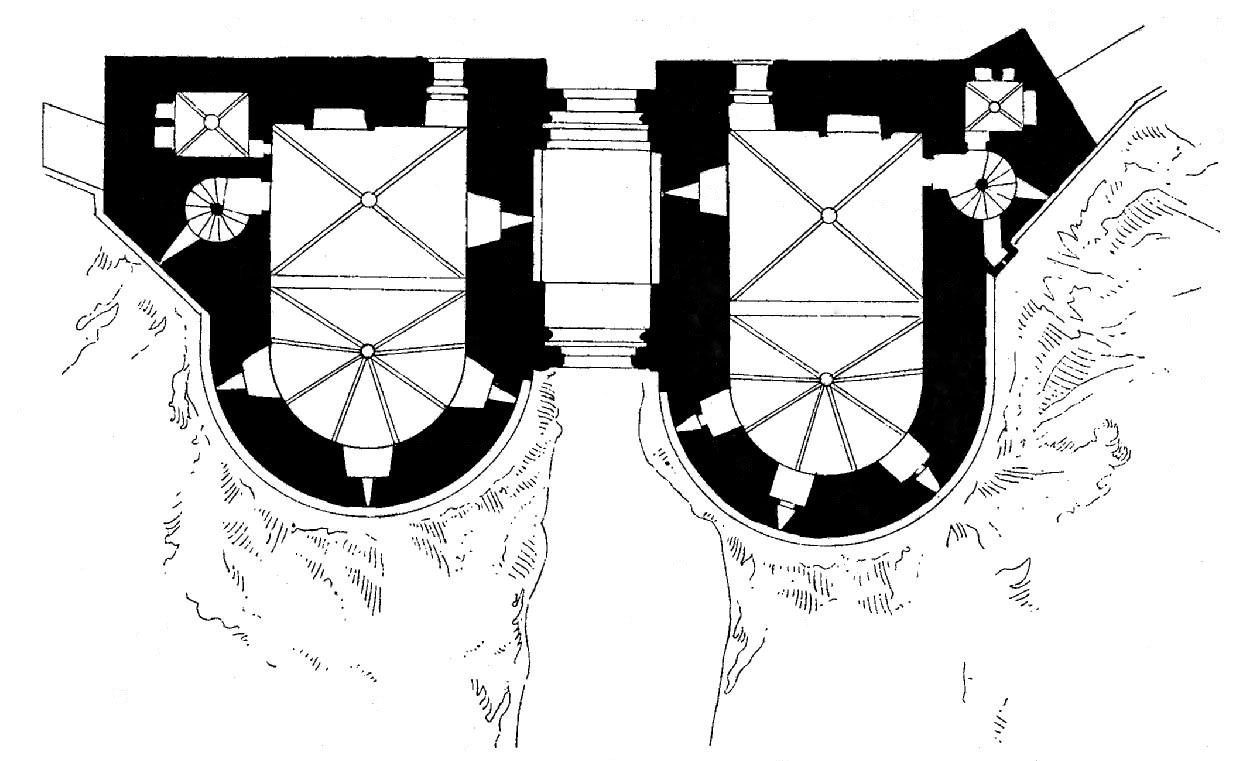
Plan of the twin towers that form the gatehouse

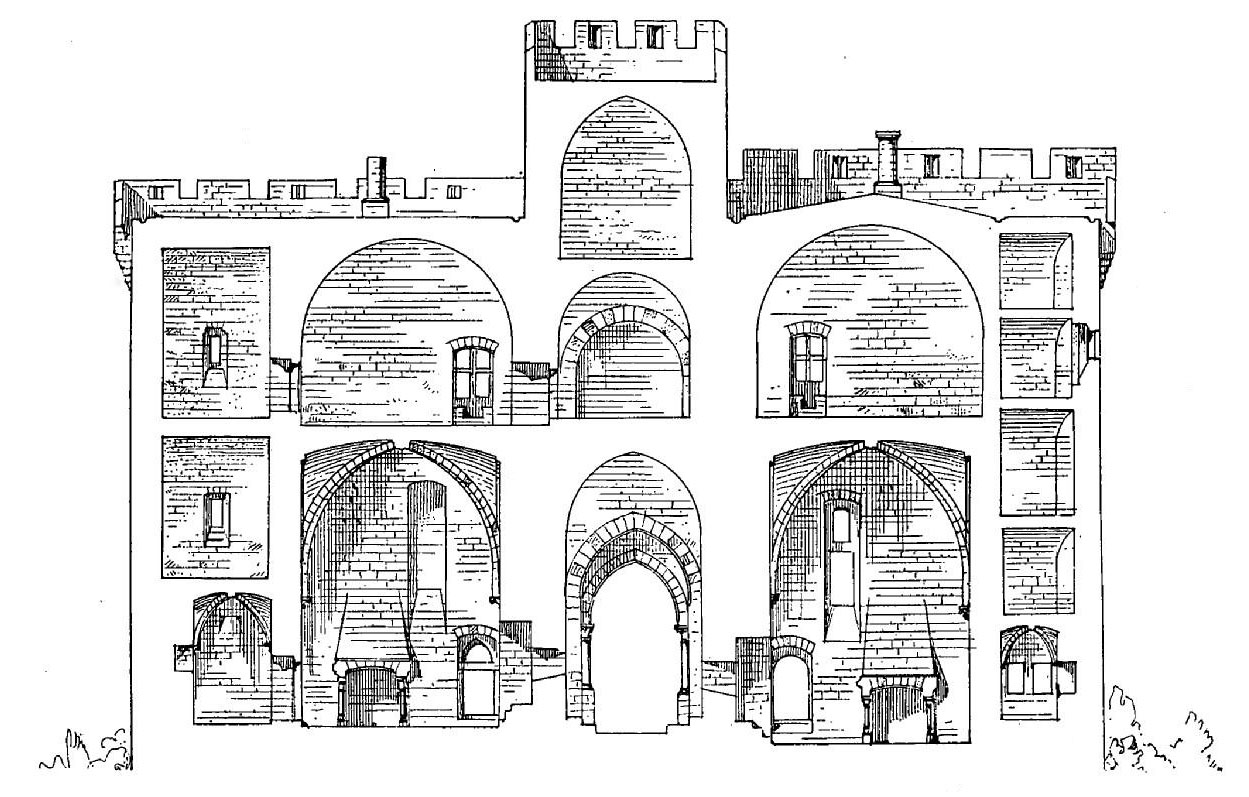
East-west section through the gatehouse looking north

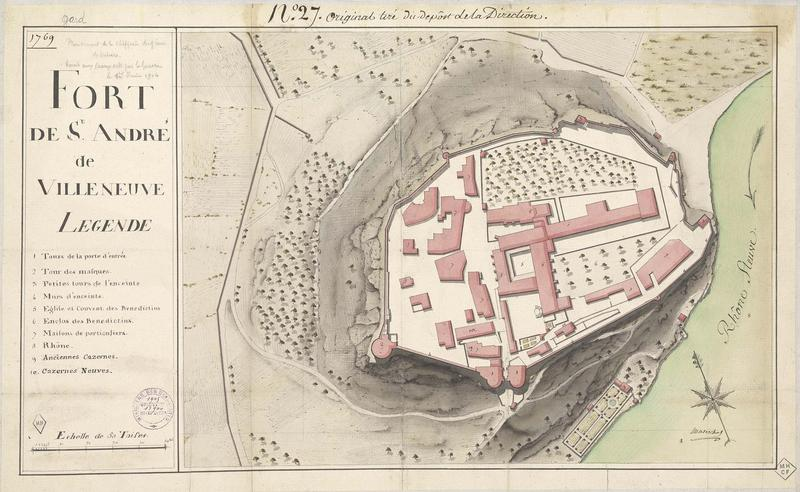
Plan of Mount Andaon in 1769

== Preservation ==
The Fort Saint-André is included as a monument historique by decrees of the 25 April 1903 and 14 November 1925. The site is regularly open to the public for a fee, though it receives a fraction of the visitors at the nearby Palais des Papes.

Iconography

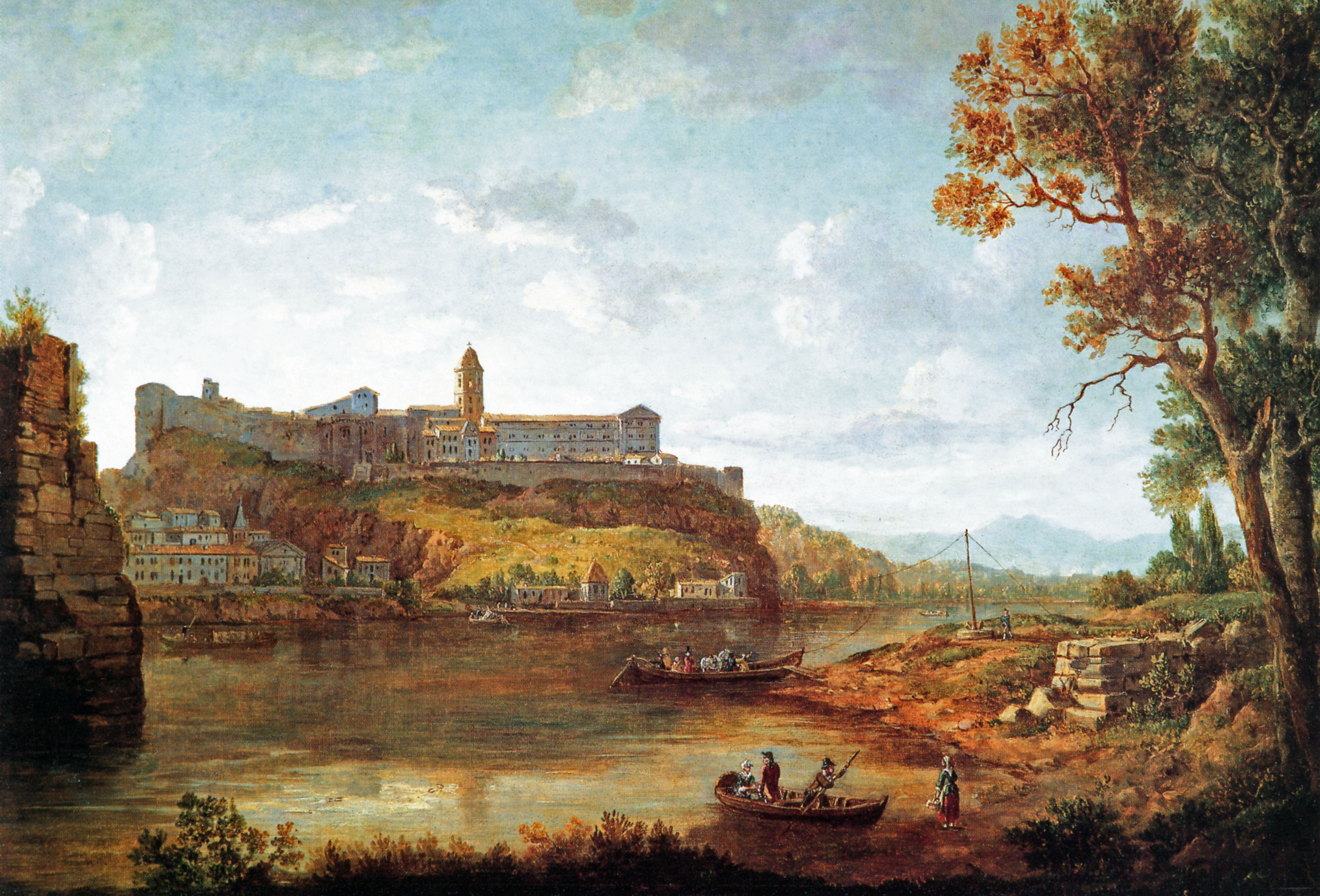
View across the Rhone from the Île de Barthelasse showing the abbey rising above the ramparts of the fortress. The picture was painted between 1766 and 1768 by William Marlow.

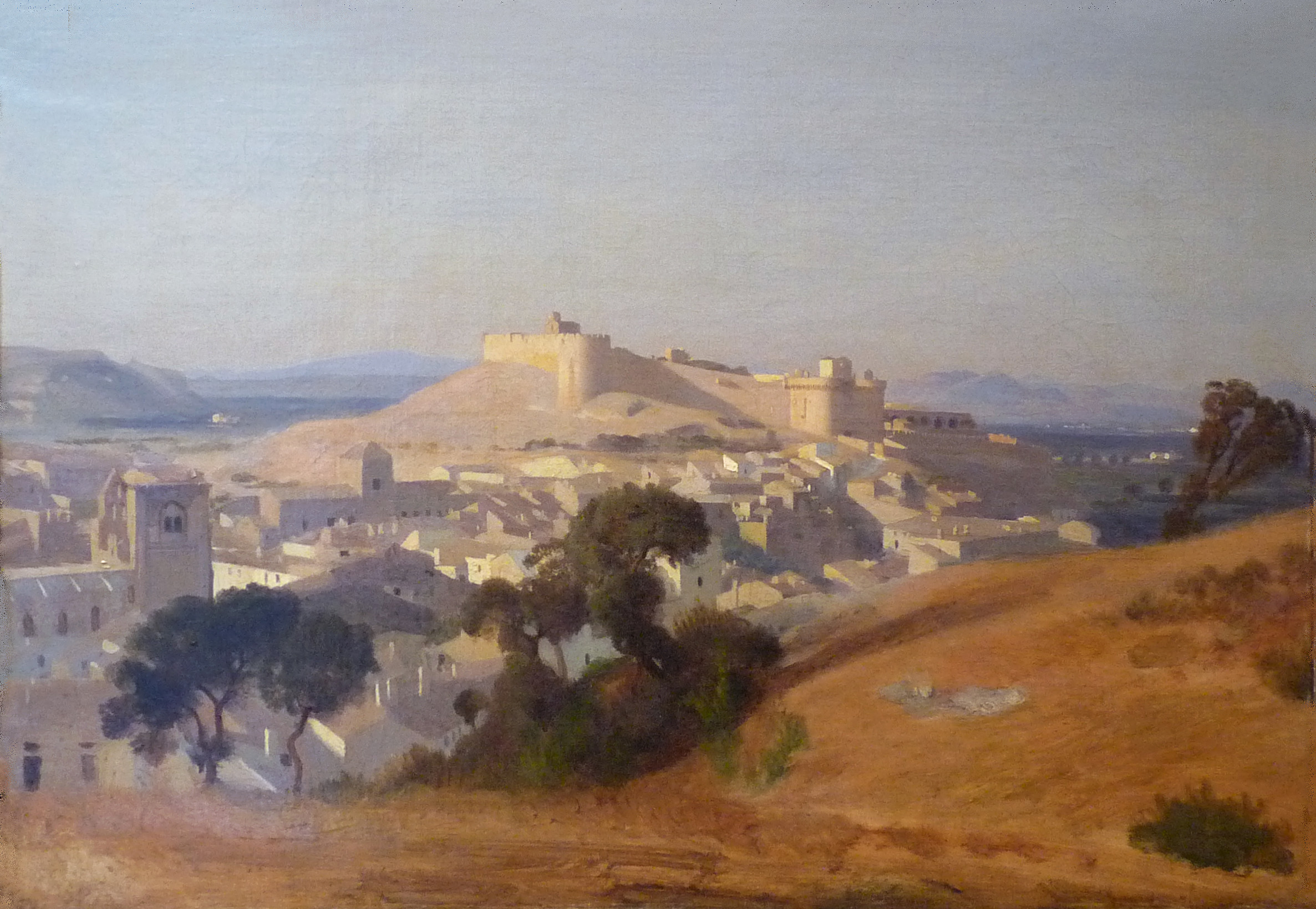
View over Villeneuve-lès-Avignon in 1836 by Prosper Marilhat. By this date the abbey had been demolished.

== Gallery ==
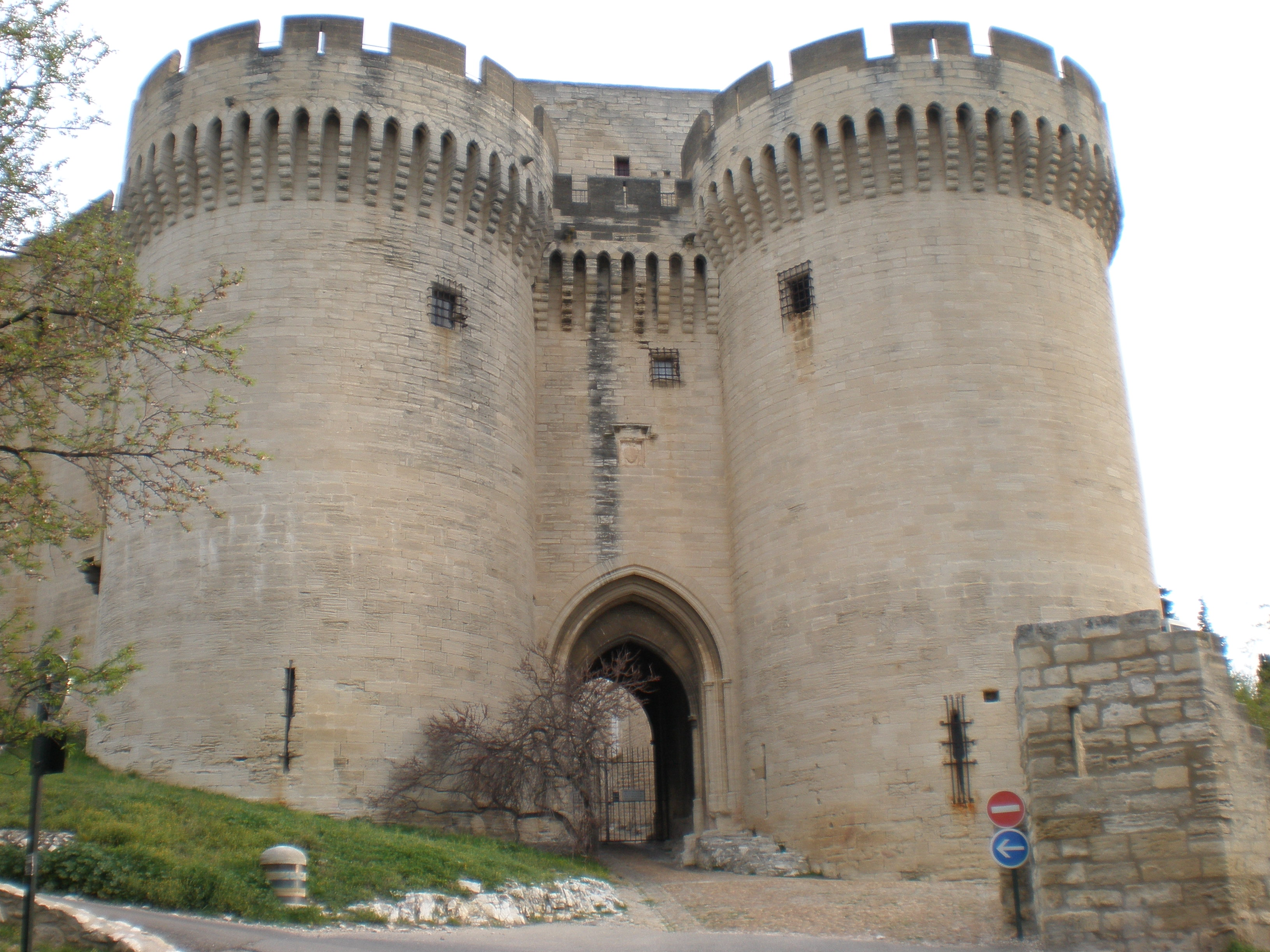
Gatehouse

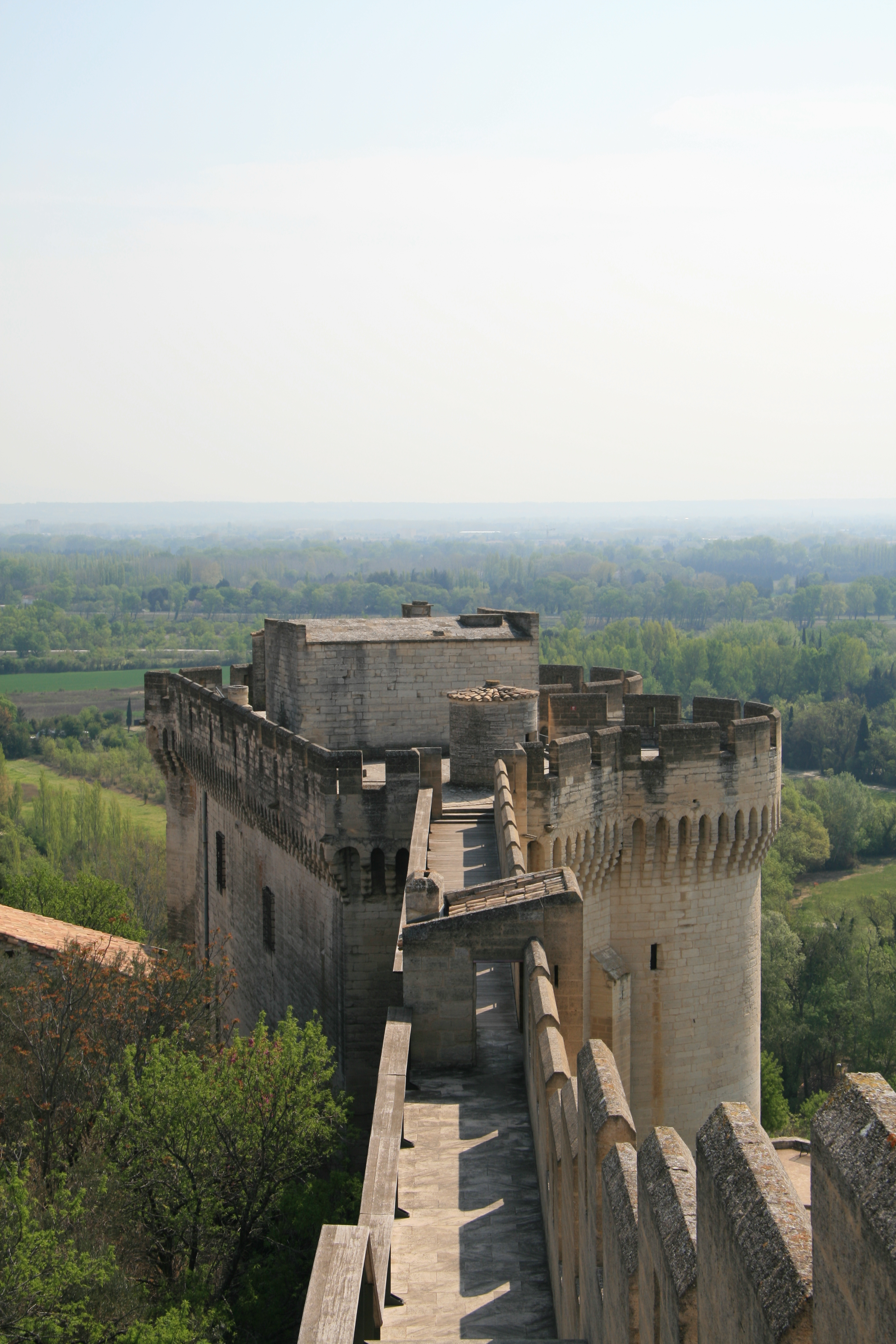
View along the ramparts towards the gatehouse

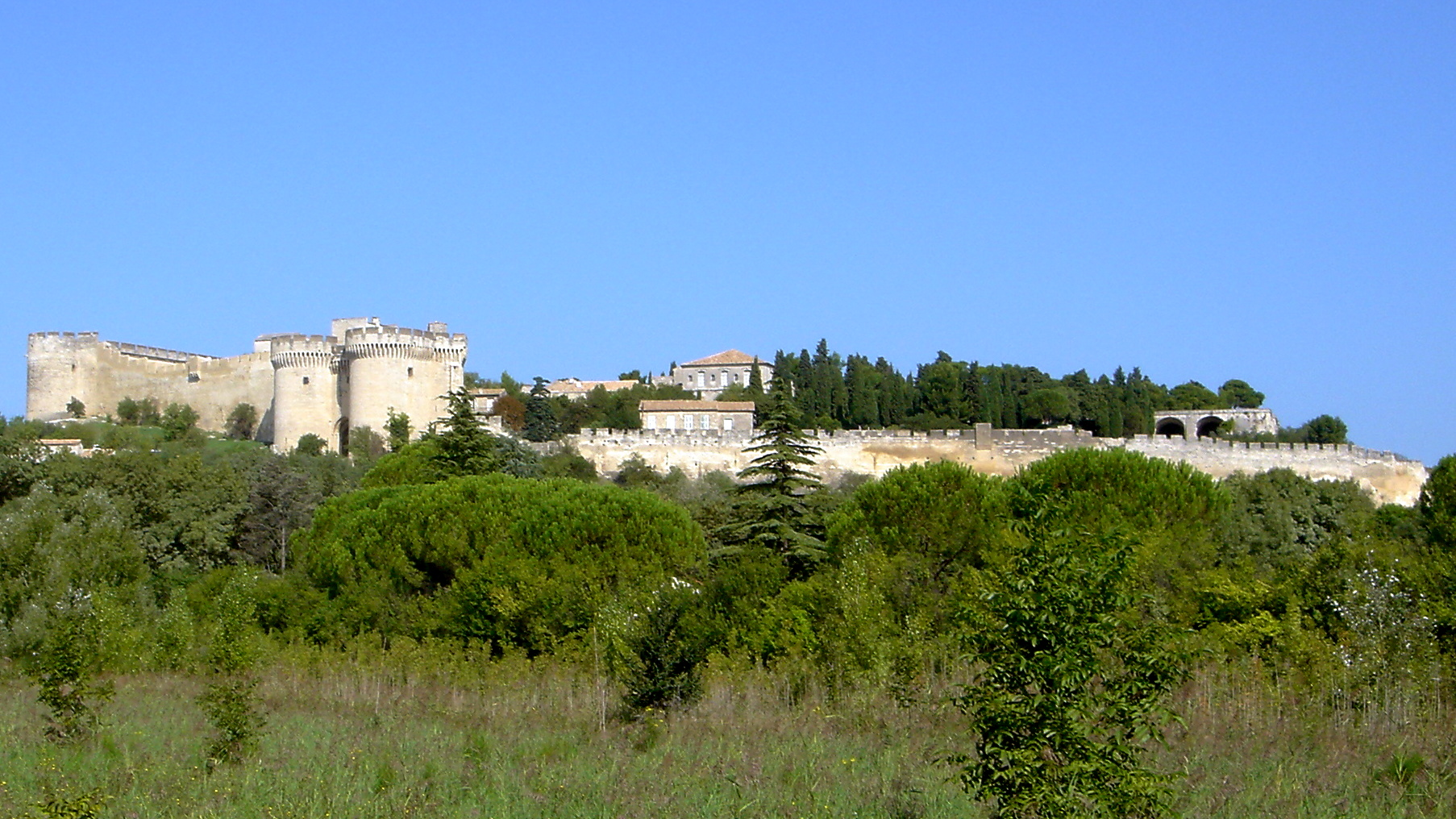
View of the fortress from the southeast

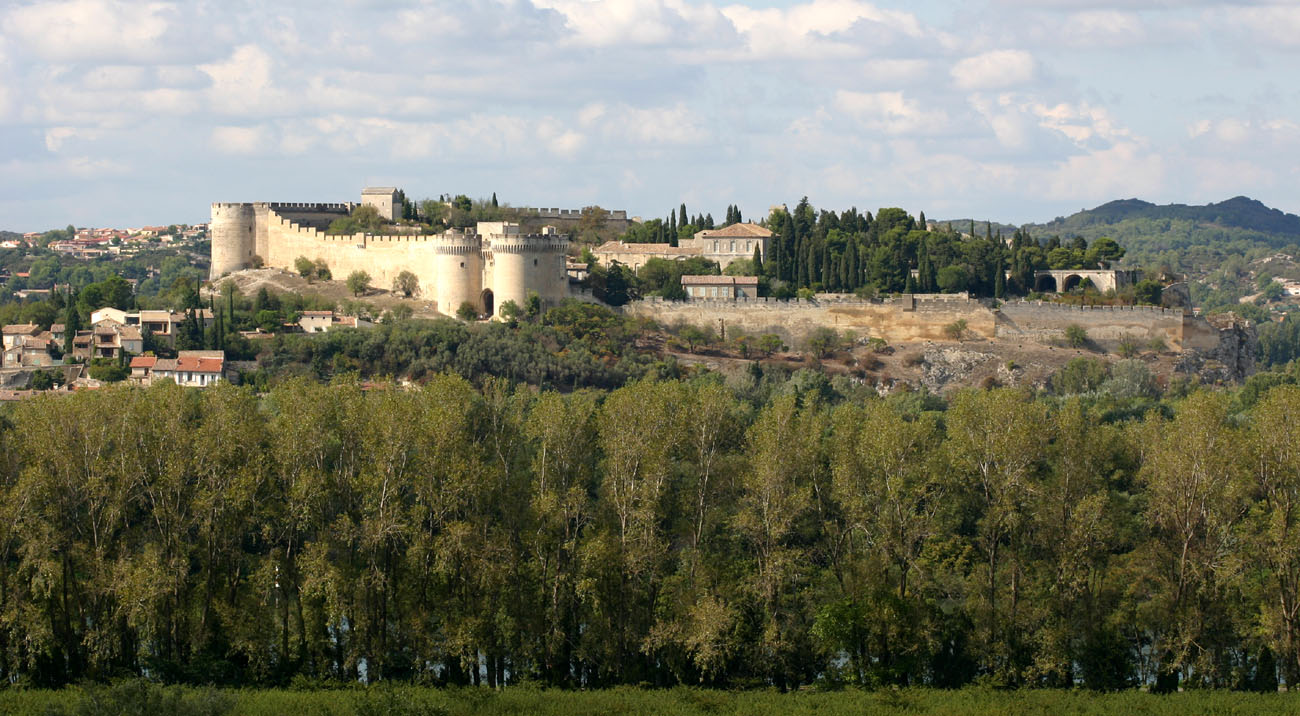
View of the fortress from Avignon

== See also ==
- List of castles in France
- Tower of Philip the Fair – a contemporary construction only a few hundred meters from the castle

== Sources ==
- Barruol, Guy; Sournia, Bernard; Vayssettes, Jean-Louis (2001), "Archéologie de l'abbaye médiévale Saint-André", in Barruol, Guy; Bacou, Roseline; Girard, Alain (eds.), L'Abbaye Saint-André-lès-Avignon: histoire, archéologie, rayonnement (in French), Mane, Alpes-de-Haute-Provence, France: Alpes de Lumière, pp. 49–68, ISBN 2-906162-54-X.
- Barruol, Guy (2001), "Le temporel de l'abbaye Saint-André au haut Moyen Âge", in Barruol, Guy; Bacou, Roseline; Girard, Alain (eds.), L'Abbaye Saint-André-lès-Avignon: histoire, archéologie, rayonnement (in French), Mane, Alpes-de-Haute-Provence, France: Alpes de Lumière, pp. 209–233, ISBN 2-906162-54-X.
- Duhamel, P. (1879), "La Tour de Philippe le Bel à Villeneuve-les-Avignon", Bulletin historique et archéologique de Vaucluse (in French), 1: Part 1 pp. 81–87 (Issue 2), Part 2 pp. 127–132 (Issue 3), Part 3 pp. 170–175 (Issue 4), Part 4 pp. 291–305 (Issue 7), Pièces Justificatives (7) pp. 306–313 (Issue 4). A scan of the article is also available from the Internet Archive without the figures.
- Hayez, Michel (2001), "L'abbaye Saint-André de Villeneuve à l'époque des papes d'Avignon", in Barruol, Guy; Bacou, Roseline; Girard, Alain (eds.), L'Abbaye Saint-André-lès-Avignon: histoire, archéologie, rayonnement (in French), Mane, Alpes-de-Haute-Provence, France: Alpes de Lumière, pp. 161–174, ISBN 2-906162-54-X.
- Falque, Maurice (1908), Étude des procès et contestations sur la propriété du Rhône et de la ville d'Avignon, 1302-1818 (Doctoral Thesis) (in French and Latin), Montpellier: Société anonyme de l'imprimerie générale du Midi.
- Maigret, Chantal (2000), "Le château de Saint-André", Congrès archéologique de France – Monuments du Gard, 157e session 1999 (in French), Paris: Société française d'archéologie, pp. 489–493.
- Maigret, Chantal (2002), "La tour Philippe le Bel 1303–2003: 700 ans d'histoire", Études vauclusiennes (in French), 68: 5–22.
- Payan, Paul (2001), "L'abbaye Saint-André à la rencontre des pouvoirs. Un enjeu stratégique entre France et Avignon (XIIIe–XIVe siècles)", in Barruol, Guy; Bacou, Roseline; Girard, Alain (eds.), L'Abbaye Saint-André-lès-Avignon: histoire, archéologie, rayonnement (in French), Mane, Alpes-de-Haute-Provence, France: Alpes de Lumière, pp. 155–160, ISBN 2-906162-54-X.
