= Saint-André Abbey =

Abbey in Gard, France

Coordinates: 43.9661°N 4.8011°E

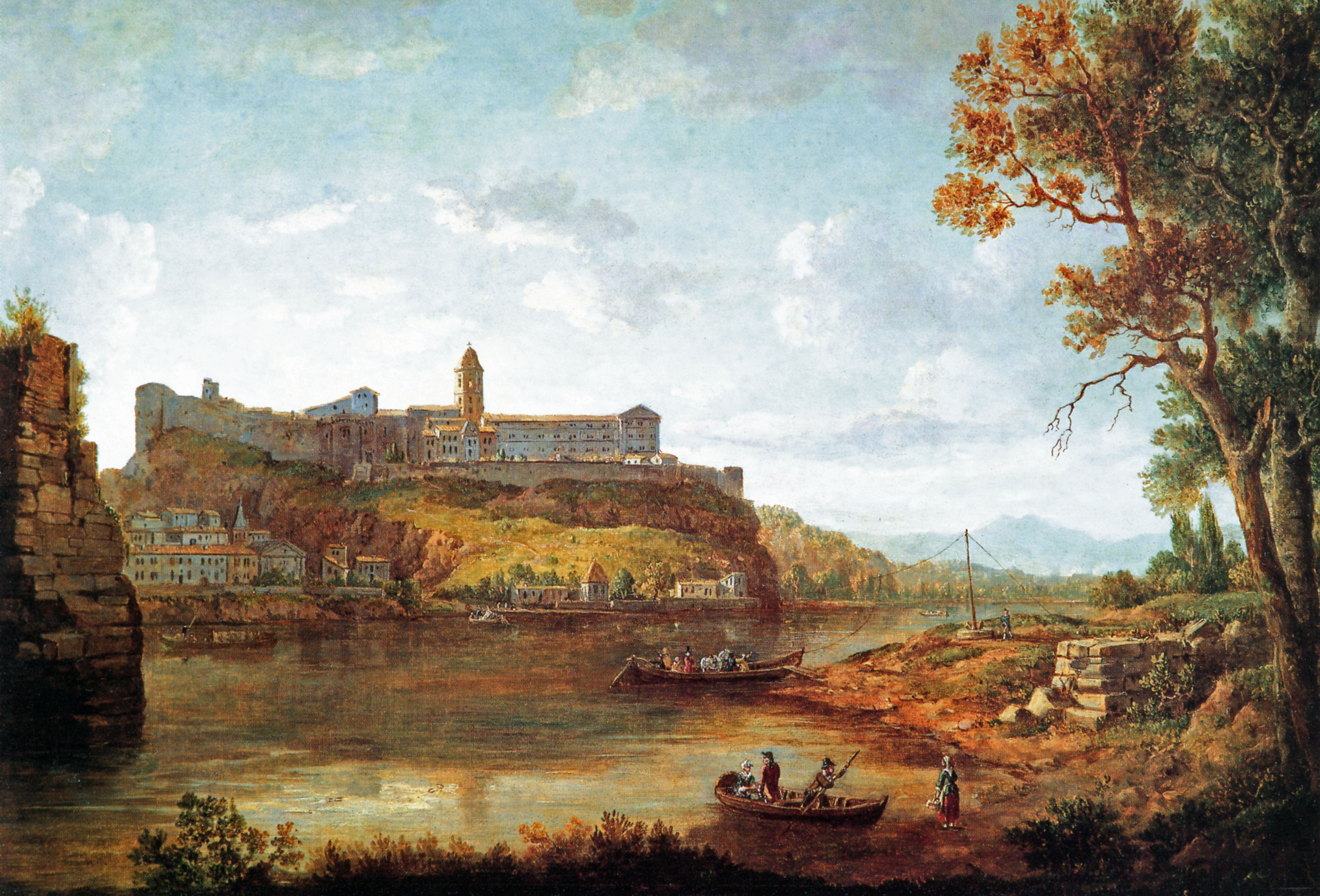
The Abbaye Saint-André de Villeneuve-lès-Avignon, William Marlow (Musée Pierre-de-Luxembourg, Villeneuve-lès-Avignon).

Saint-André Abbey (abbaye Saint-André) was a Benedictine abbey in Villeneuve-lès-Avignon at the top of Mont-Andaon.

== List of abbots ==
List of Abbots
Tenure	Name	Notes
986-999	Gison	
999-1014	Martin	
1024-1040	Rainoard	
1045-1046	Emine	
1046-1050	Raymond I	
1050-1057	Ermengaud	
1057	Geoffroy Pelet	
1057-1059	Giron	
1060-1063	Roland	
1063-1087	Saint Pons I or Ponce	(Note: "He consecrated himself to God in this monastery with his father and his brother around the year 1050 and became abbot, he died on 24 or 26 March 1087. The monk Ramnufle wrote his life around 1097.)
1087-1132	Pierre I Damiac	
1133-1154	Gérard de Pujault	
1154-1171	Pons II de Claret	
1171-1177	Raymond II Trimond	
1178-1195	Guillaume I de Pujault	
1196-1227	Bermond de Clausonne de Saint-Gilles	
1229-1233	Guillaume II de Cépion	
1234-1259	Calvaire de Clausonne de Saint-Gilles	
1259-1265	Bertrand I Auger	
1266-1268	Rostaing I de Rébolle	
1268-1271	Pierre II Geoffroy	
1271-1290	Pierre III de Montousier	
1291-1293	Bertrand II de Laon	
1293-1311	Bertrand III Raimbaud	
1311-1326	Bérenger de Coyran	
1327-1340	Rostaing II de Mérindole	
1340-1353	Arnaud de Lauzières	
1353-1354	Jaubert Lambert de Livron	
1354-1361	Raymond III d’Apcher	
1362-1378	Guy de Vassignac	
1378-1383	Savary Chrétien	
1383-1384	Ange de Grimoard	
1385-1427	Guillaume III de Villate	
1428-14??	Jean I de Vervins	
14??-1437	Eudes Alleman	
1438-1448	Pons III de Sarrazin	
1448-1450	Jean de Bourbon	
1450-1463	Zénon de Céné	
1464-1477	Cardinal Giacomo Ammannati-Piccolomini	
1478-1521	Pierre IV d’Arpajon de Séverac	
1521-1539	Louis I d’Aube de Roquemartine	
1540-1566	François I de Castellane	
1567-1572	Claude Page	
1573-1598	César de Brancas	
1599-1631	Jean III Sicard	
1631-16??	François II de Grimoard de Beauvoir du Roure de Grisac	
1642?-1678	Jean-Baptiste I de Grimoard de Beauvoir du Roure de Grisac	(Note: Already leading the abbey in 1642, where he appointed an abbot to head the abbey church of Notre-Dame-et-Saint-Michel in Goudargues.)
1678-1679	Joseph de Grimoard de Beauvoir du Roure de Grisac	
1680-1728	Louis II François de Grimoard de Beauvoir du Roure de Grisac	
1728-1748	Thomas Southcott	
1748-1766	Cardinal Jean-Baptiste II de Belloy de Morangles	
1766-1773	Gaspard de Tressemane-Brunet de Simiane	
1773-1779	Jean IV de Cairol de Madaillan	

== Bibliography (in French) ==
- Dom Michel Germain, Matériaux du Monasticon Gallicanum, ms. Latin 11821 « S. Andræ Avenionis Monasterii scenographia »
- Bibliothèque nationale, Copies des chartes concernant Saint-André de Villeneuve-lès-Avignon et Saint-André de Gap, Ms latins, n° 12 659 and 12 777
- Abbé Méritan, « Étude sur les abbés et le monastère de Saint-André de Villeneuve-lez-Avignon », in Mémoires de l'Académie de Vaucluse, 1898, tome 17, p. 273-291 (online)
- Abbé Méritan, « Notes sur les prieurés dépendant de Saint-André », in Mémoires de l'Académie de Vaucluse, 1898, volume 17, p. 292-308 (online)
- Léon-Honoré Labande, « Villeneuve-lez-Avignon : Monastère et fort Saint-André. Chapelle de Notre-Dame-de-Belvézet », in Congrès archéologique de France, 76e session. Avignon. 1909, volume 1, Guide du congrès, Paris, Société française d'archéologie, 1910, p. 131-138
- Joseph Girard, Évocation du Vieil Avignon, Les Éditions de minuit, Paris, 1958, p. 381
- Roseline Bacou, « L'abbaye Saint-André à Villeneuve-lès-Avignon », in Congrès archéologique de France. 121e session. Avignon et Comtat Venaissin. 1963, Paris, Société française d'archéologie, 1963, p. 195-201
- Alain Breton, « Villeneuve-lez-Avignon. Saint-André : l'abbaye mauriste », in Congrès archéologique de France. 157e session. Gard. 1999, Paris, Société française d'archéologie, 2000, 547 p., p. 495-509
- Guy Barruol, Roseline Bacou et Alain Girard, L'Abbaye de Saint-André de Villeneuve-lès-Avignon, Actes du colloque interrégional tenu en 1999 à l'occasion du millénaire de la fondation de l'abbaye Saint-André de Villeneuve-lès-Avignon, Éd. Alpes de Lumières, Cahiers de Salagon n° 4, Mane, 2001, 448 p. ISSN 1254-9371 ISBN 978-2-906162-54-9

== External links (in French) ==
- L'histoire de l'abbaye de Saint André
- Abbaye Saint-André de Villeneuve-lès-Avignon : actes du colloque
