= Roseline Bacou =

- Born: May 21, 1923; Le Pradet, Var, France
- Died: February 8, 2013 (aged 89); Villeneuve-lès-Avignon, Gard, France
- Education: University of Montpellier
- Relatives: Gustave Fayet (grandfather)

Rosaline Bacou (21 May 1923 - 8 February 2013) was a French art historian, specialising in Odilon Redon. She was also inspector general of national museums in charge of the prints and drawings department at the Louvre and curator of the Abbaye Saint-André.

== Life ==
She was born in Le Pradet to Simone and Paul Bacou, making her granddaughter of Gustave Fayet. She studied art history at the University of Montpellier and in 1949 joined the prints and drawings department at the Louvre, heading it from 1984 until retirement in 1988, reorganising it and making important acquisitions such as a group of women by Antonello da Messina.

She commissioned several exhibitions of French, Italian and Flemish drawings and published works on Redon's work, organising his first retrospective in 1956 and studying the donation by Arï and Suzanne Redon. On Elsa Koeberlé's death in 1950, Bacou continued Koeberlé and her friend Génia Lioubow's work restoring the abbaye Saint-André in Villeneuve-lès-Avignon, acquired by her grandfather in 1916. On 8 February 2013 she died at the abbey

== Publications ==
- (with Michel Florisoone and Jacqueline Bouchot-Saupique): Chefs-d'œuvre vénitiens de Paolo Veneziano à Tintoret, Paris, Musée de l'Orangerie, 1954
- Odilon Redon, Genève, P. Cailler, 1956. 2 vol., prix Hercule-Catenacci de l’Académie française en 1957]
- (with Arï Redon): Lettres de Gauguin, Gide, Huysmans, Jammes, Mallarmé, Verhaeren... à Odilon Redon, Paris, Corti, 1960
- (with Arlette Calvet and Françoise Coulanger-Rosenberg): Le 16th century européen : dessins du Louvre, Partis, Ministère des affaires culturelles, 1965 [catalogue]
- Piranèse : gravures et dessins, Paris, Chêne, 1974 [aussi traduit en néerlandais (1974), en anglais (1975), en allemand (1975)]
- Cartons d'artistes du xve au xixe siècle : LVe exposition du Cabinet des dessins, Musée du Louvre 25 janvier-27 mai 1974, Paris, Éd. des Musées nationaux, 1974
- Millet : dessins, Fribourg, Office du Livre, 1975
- (with Sylvie Béguin and A. Méo): Autour de Raphael : dessins et peintures du Musée du Louvre, Paris Réunion des musées nationaux, 1984 [catalogue]

== External links (in French) ==
- "Roseline Bacou parle de ses souvenirs de premier inspecteur général femme des musées nationaux, chargée du département des arts graphiques du musée du Louvre". amelier.com. 2006.
- "Musée du Louvre, galerie Mollien : exposition de dessins classiques ayant appartenu à un grand collectionneur du 18th century, Pierre-Jean Mariette. Interview with Maurice Serullaz, chief curator of the cabinet des dessins and Roseline Bacou, organisers of the exhibition (at 9 min 45 s)". ina.fr. 14 May 1967. (at 11 min 40 s : The Fall of Phaeton, Michelangelo)
