= Paréage =

Treaty of joint sovereignty of a land

In Medieval France a paréage or pariage was a feudal treaty recognising joint sovereignty over a territory by two rulers, who were on an equal footing, pari passu; compare peer. On a familial scale, paréage could also refer to the equal division of lands and the titles they brought between sons of an inheritance.

Such a power-sharing contract could be signed between two secular rulers or, more often, by a secular and an ecclesiastic ruler, as happened in the most famous case—the Act of paréage of 1278, which served as the legal basis for the Principality of Andorra and was signed by the Count of Foix and Viscount of Castellbo and the Bishop of Urgell. According to the act, the Count and the Bishop were to receive taxes in alternating years, while jointly appointing local representatives to administer justice, and they were to refrain from making war within Andorra (where they were each nevertheless allowed to levy soldiers). The wording of a paréage, an exercise in defining reciprocity without sacrificing suzerainty, was the special domain of ministerial lawyers, who were produced in the universities from the late eleventh century.

Contracts of paréage were very numerous in the regions of intensely protected local rights, Languedoc and Catalonia, during the high and late Middle Ages, especially between lay and clerical interests. Erecting new towns called bastides repopulated "desert" or uninhabited lands: "in an effort to colonize the wooded wilderness of southwest France, almost seven hundred towns were founded during the two centuries between 1200 and 1400". A formal agreement of paréage was often necessary. By the terms of several paréages agreed upon between the Cistercian abbey of Bonnefont-en-Comminges on the one hand and the local seigneur or the king on the other, the Abbey granted the land from one of its outlying granges, the king granted certain liberties, such as market privileges, that made the new village attractive, and the two agreed to split tax revenues. An example of a paréage that was settled through the arbitration of William Durant the Younger, established the "paréage of Mende" (1307), between the bishop of Mende in the Lozère and Philip IV of France; it remained in effect until 1789.
