= Villeneuve-lès-Avignon =

- Commune
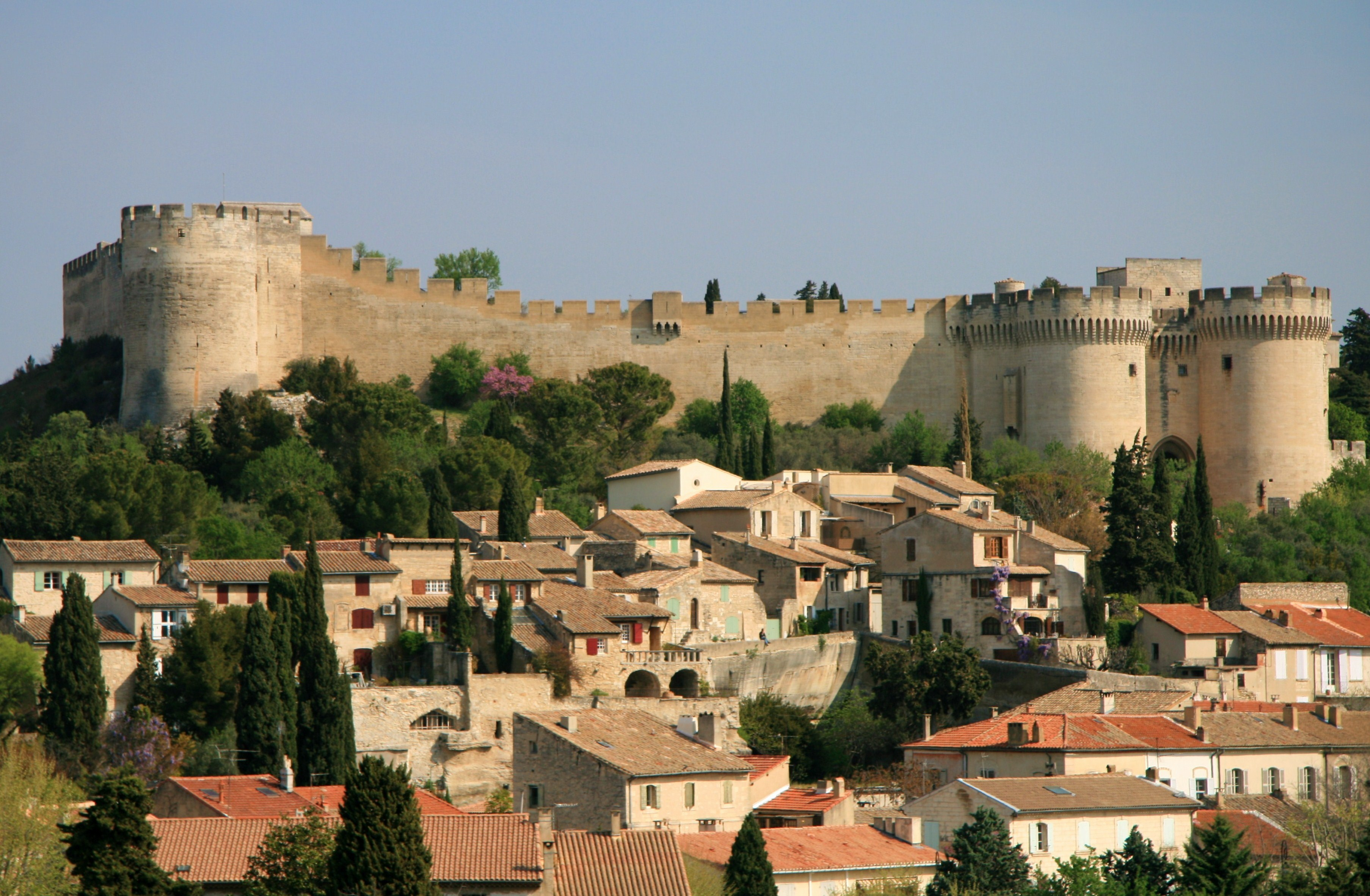
- Fort Saint-André on Mont Andaon

- Coat of arms
- Location of Villeneuve-lès-Avignon
- Location within France Location within Occitanie
- Coordinates: 43°58′02″N 4°47′48″E
- Country: France
- Region: Occitania
- Department: Gard
- Arrondissement: Nîmes
- Canton: Villeneuve-lès-Avignon
- Intercommunality: CA Grand Avignon

Government
  - Mayor (2020–2026): Pascale Bories
- Area^{1}: 18.27 km^{2} (7.05 sq mi)
- Elevation: 25 m (82 ft)
- Highest elevation: 181 m (594 ft)
- Lowest elevation: 10 m (33 ft)
- Population (2023): 13,148
  - Density: 719.6/km^{2} (1,864/sq mi)
- Time zone: UTC+01:00 (CET)
  - Summer (DST): UTC+02:00 (CEST)
- INSEE/Postal code: 30351 /30400
- ^{1} French Land Register data, which excludes lakes, ponds, glaciers > 1 km^{2} (0.386 sq mi or 247 acres) and river estuaries.

Villeneuve-lès-Avignon (French pronunciation: [vilnœv lez‿aviɲɔ̃]; Provençal: Vilanòva d’Avinhon) is a commune in the Gard department in southern France. It can also be spelled Villeneuve-lez-Avignon.

== History ==
In the 6th century the Benedictine abbey of St André was founded on Mount Andaon, and the village which grew up round it took its name. The city itself was founded by Philippe le Bel and boasts a castle he built, Fort Saint-André.

The town was also the resort of the French cardinals during the sojourn of the popes at Avignon, in the 14th century. Another notable tourist attraction is the Tour Philippe-le-Bel, which marks the former northern terminus of the Pont d'Avignon.

== Geography ==
It is located on the right (western) bank of the river Rhône, opposite Avignon.

== Population ==
Historical population

| Year | Pop. | ±% p.a. |
|---|---|---|
| 1793 | 3,300 | — |
| 1800 | 3,297 | −0.01% |
| 1806 | 3,279 | −0.09% |
| 1821 | 3,232 | −0.10% |
| 1831 | 3,564 | +0.98% |
| 1836 | 3,633 | +0.38% |
| 1841 | 3,671 | +0.21% |
| 1846 | 3,723 | +0.28% |
| 1851 | 3,733 | +0.05% |
| 1856 | 3,252 | −2.72% |
| 1861 | 3,162 | −0.56% |
| 1866 | 3,067 | −0.61% |
| 1872 | 2,730 | −1.92% |
| 1876 | 2,910 | +1.61% |
| 1881 | 2,630 | −2.00% |
| 1886 | 2,644 | +0.11% |
| 1891 | 2,622 | −0.17% |
| 1896 | 2,735 | +0.85% |
| 1901 | 2,922 | +1.33% |

| Year | Pop. | ±% p.a. |
|---|---|---|
| 1906 | 2,890 | −0.22% |
| 1911 | 2,709 | −1.29% |
| 1921 | 2,561 | −0.56% |
| 1926 | 3,035 | +3.45% |
| 1931 | 3,635 | +3.67% |
| 1936 | 3,740 | +0.57% |
| 1946 | 4,399 | +1.64% |
| 1954 | 5,157 | +2.01% |
| 1962 | 6,422 | +2.78% |
| 1968 | 6,977 | +1.39% |
| 1975 | 8,540 | +2.93% |
| 1982 | 9,282 | +1.20% |
| 1990 | 10,730 | +1.83% |
| 1999 | 11,791 | +1.05% |
| 2007 | 12,644 | +0.88% |
| 2012 | 12,232 | −0.66% |
| 2017 | 11,698 | −0.89% |
| 2023 | 13,148 | +1.97% |

Source: EHESS and INSEE (1968–2023)

== Sights ==
- Fort Saint-André, on a hill outside the town
- Tour Philippe Le Bel, 14th century
- The church of Notre Dame, dating from the 14th century, contains a rich marble altar and significant pictures.
- Carthusian monastery Notre-Dame-du-Val-de-Bénédiction, founded in 1356 by Pope Innocent VI

== International relations ==
Villeneuve-lès-Avignon is twinned with:

- Rheinbach, Germany
- Gytheio, Greece
- San Miniato, Italy

== Gallery ==
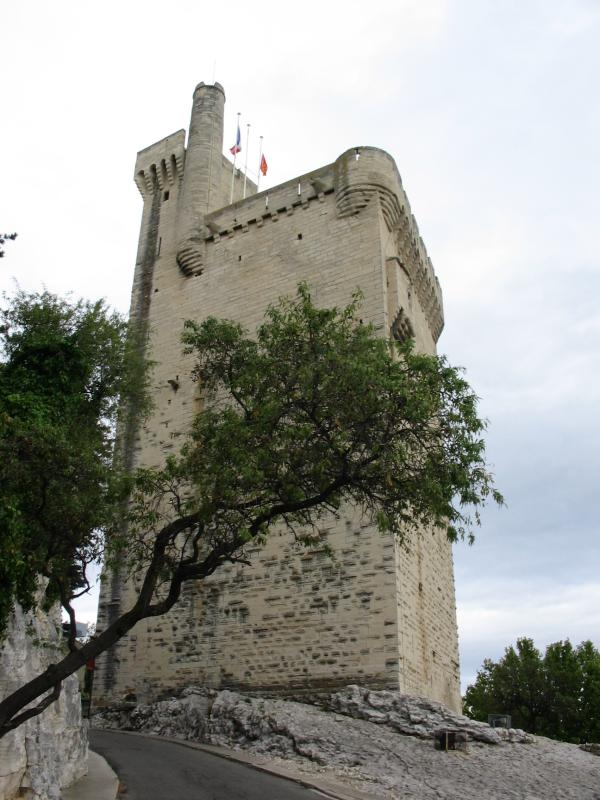
Tour Philippe Le Bel

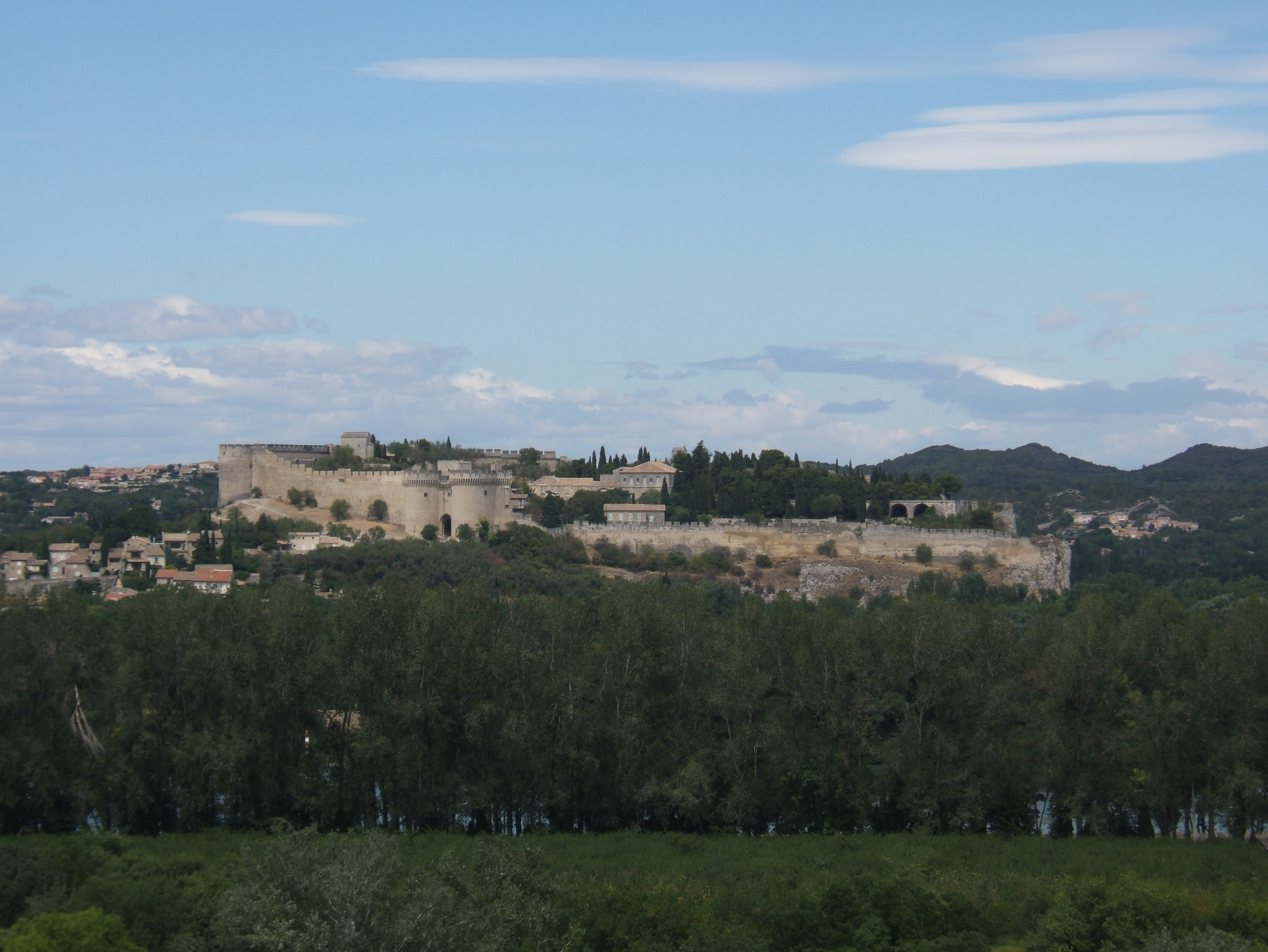
Fort Saint-André

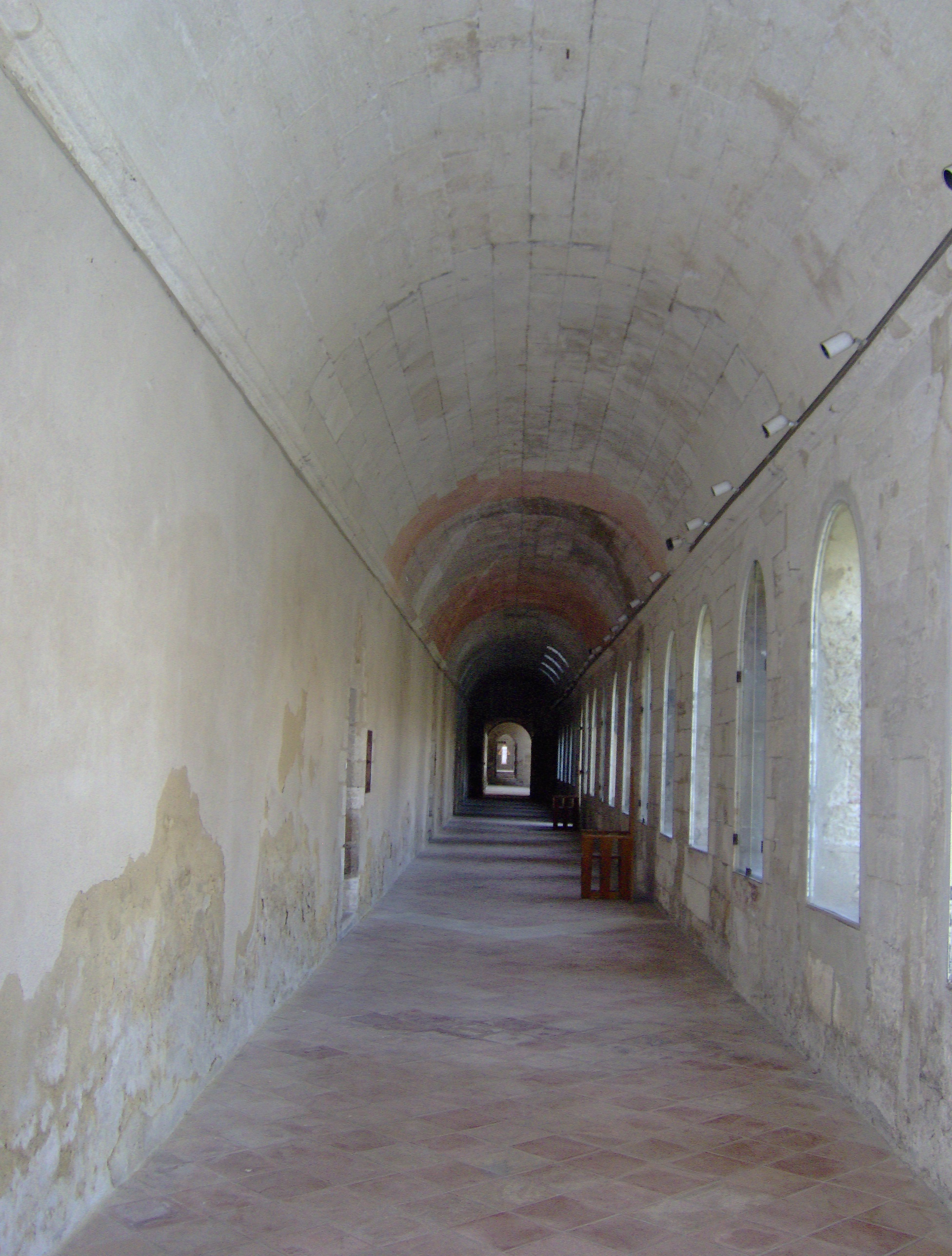
Chartreuse du Val de Bénédiction

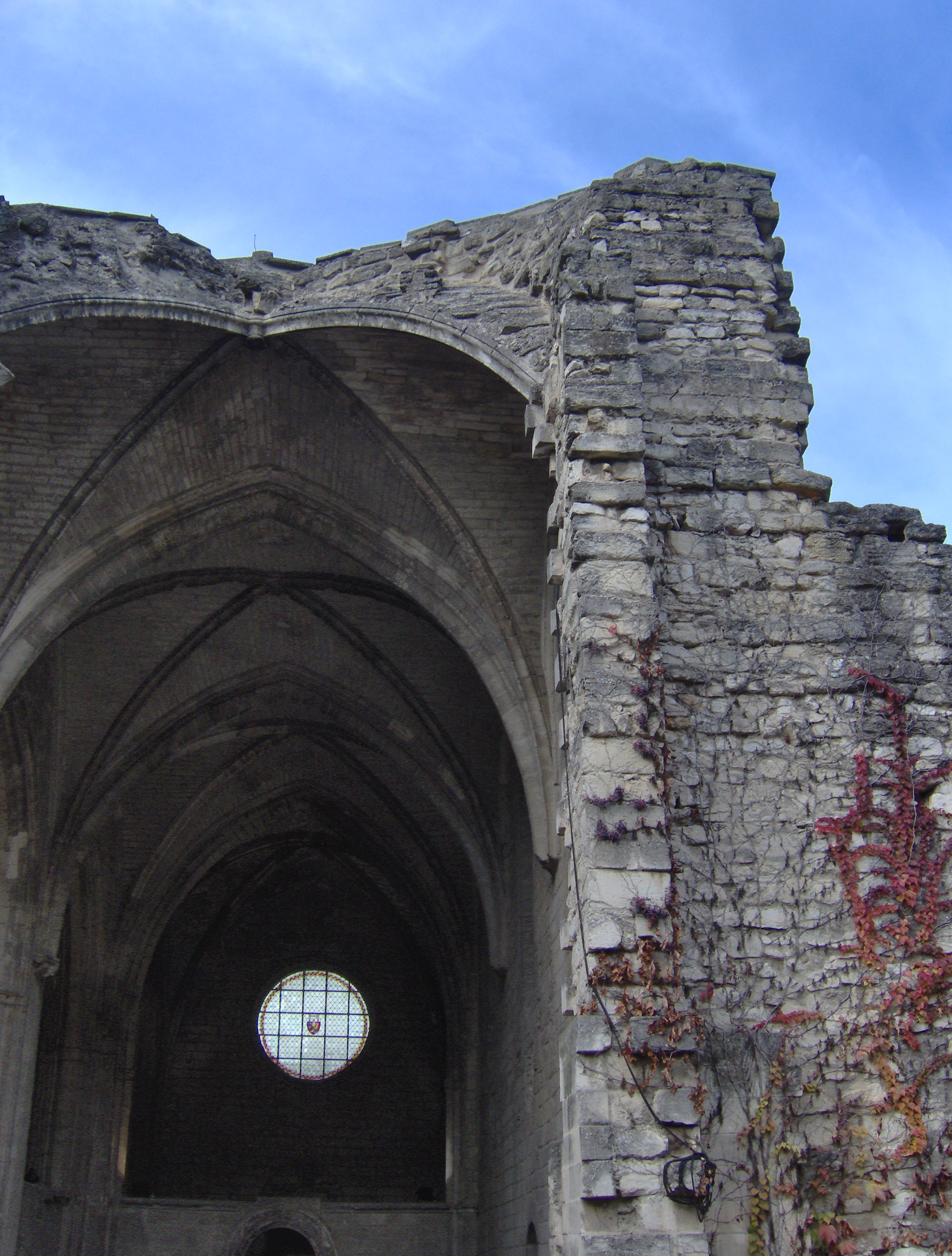
Collapsed apse of church, Chartreuse du Val de Bénédiction

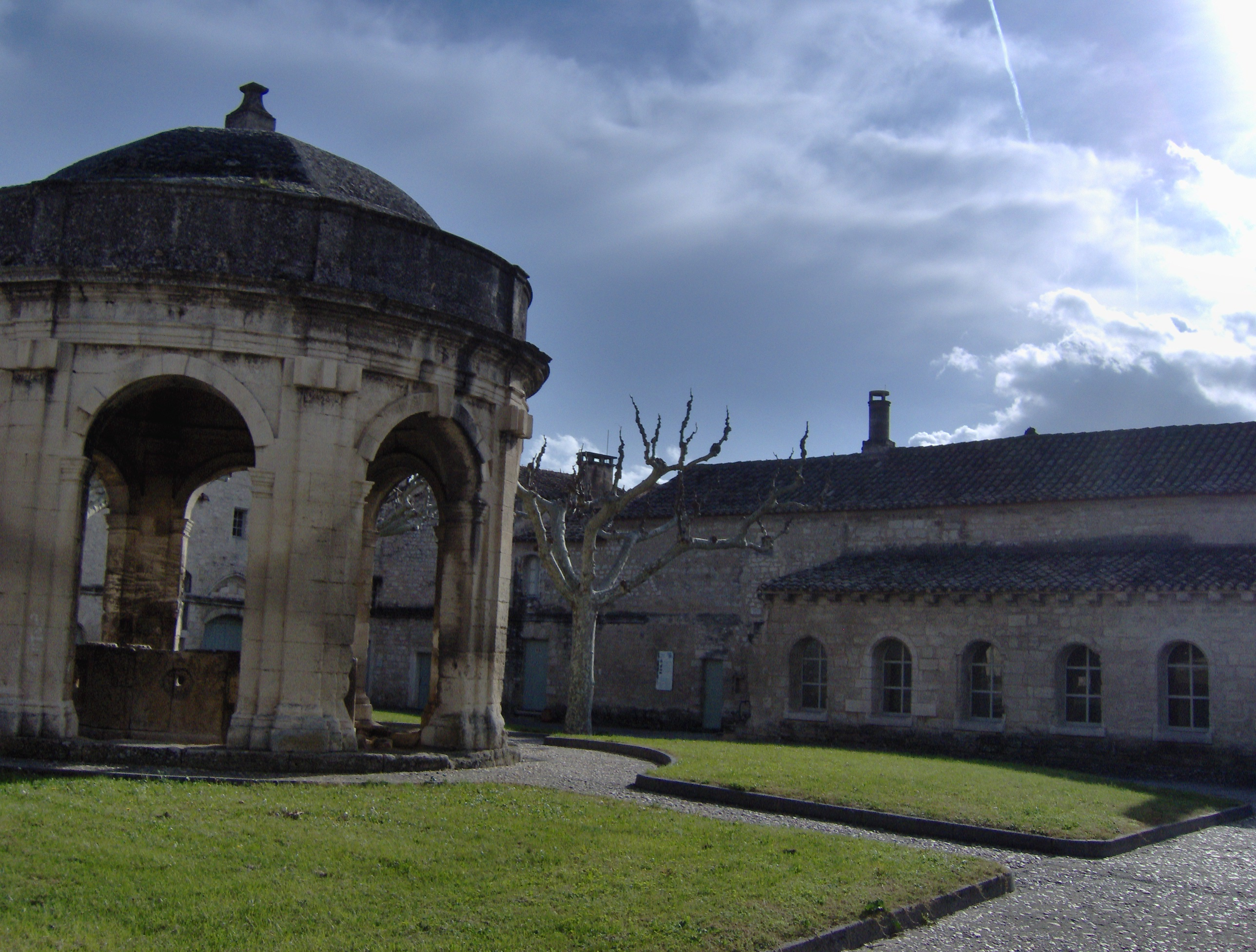
Cloister of Saint John, Chartreuse du Val de Bénédiction

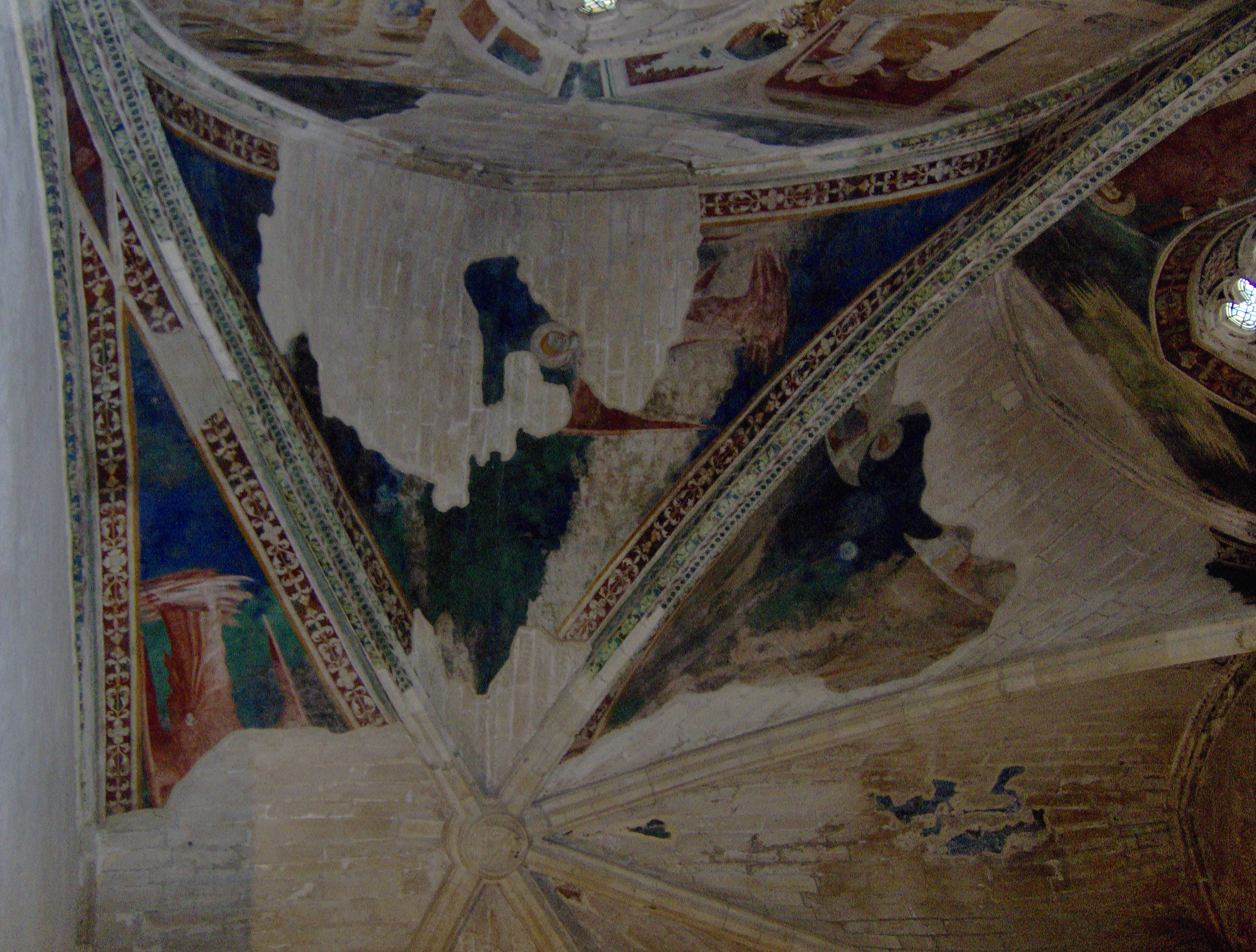
Chapel of the frescos, Chartreuse du Val de Bénédiction

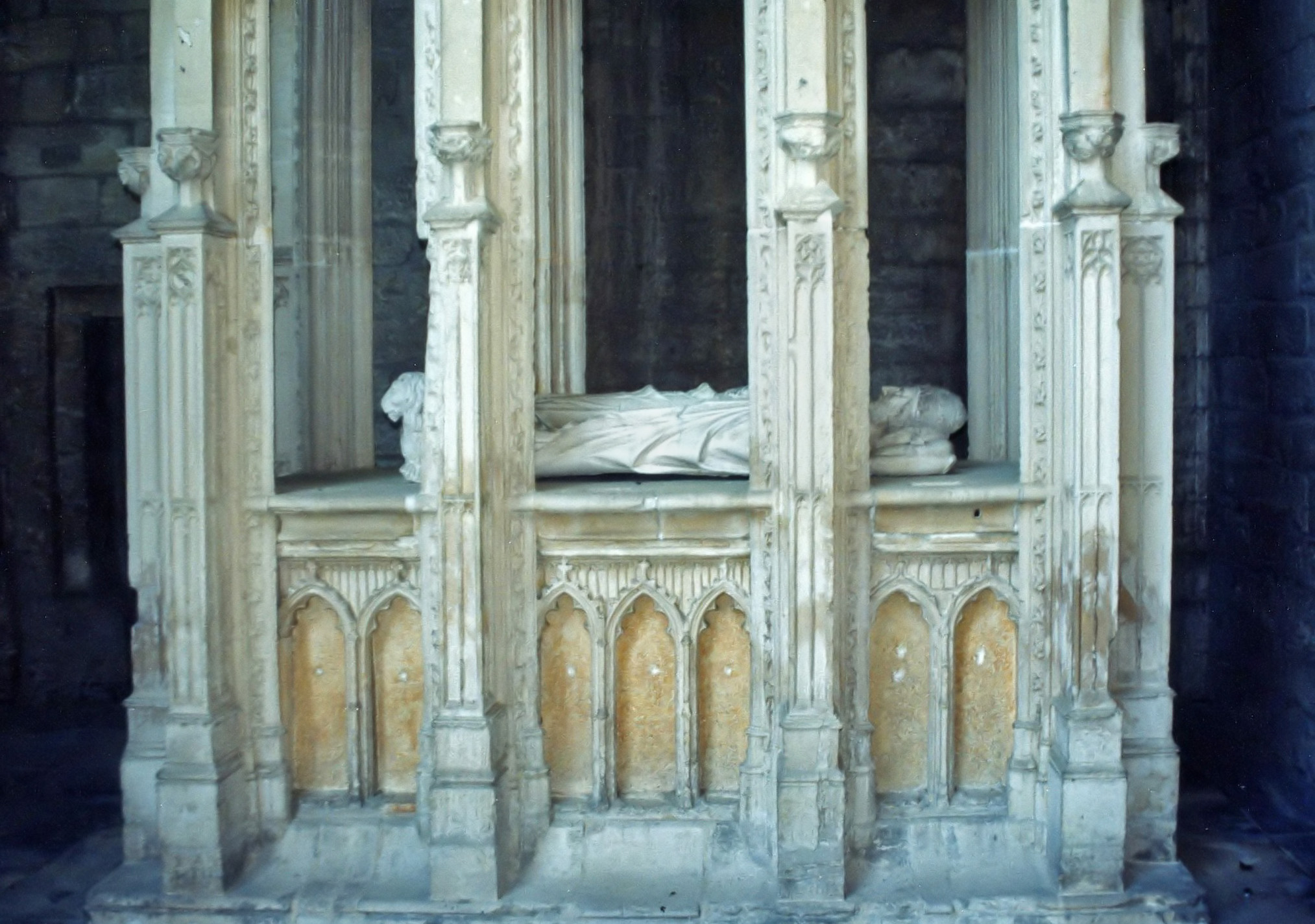
Tomb of Pope Innocent VI, Chartreuse du Val de Bénédiction

== See also ==
- Communes of the Gard department
- Pont d'Avignon
