= Auguste Caristie =

French architect

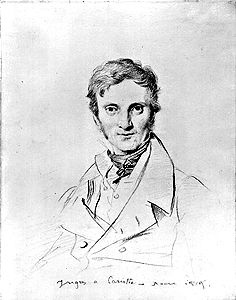
Auguste Caristie, portrait by Ingres

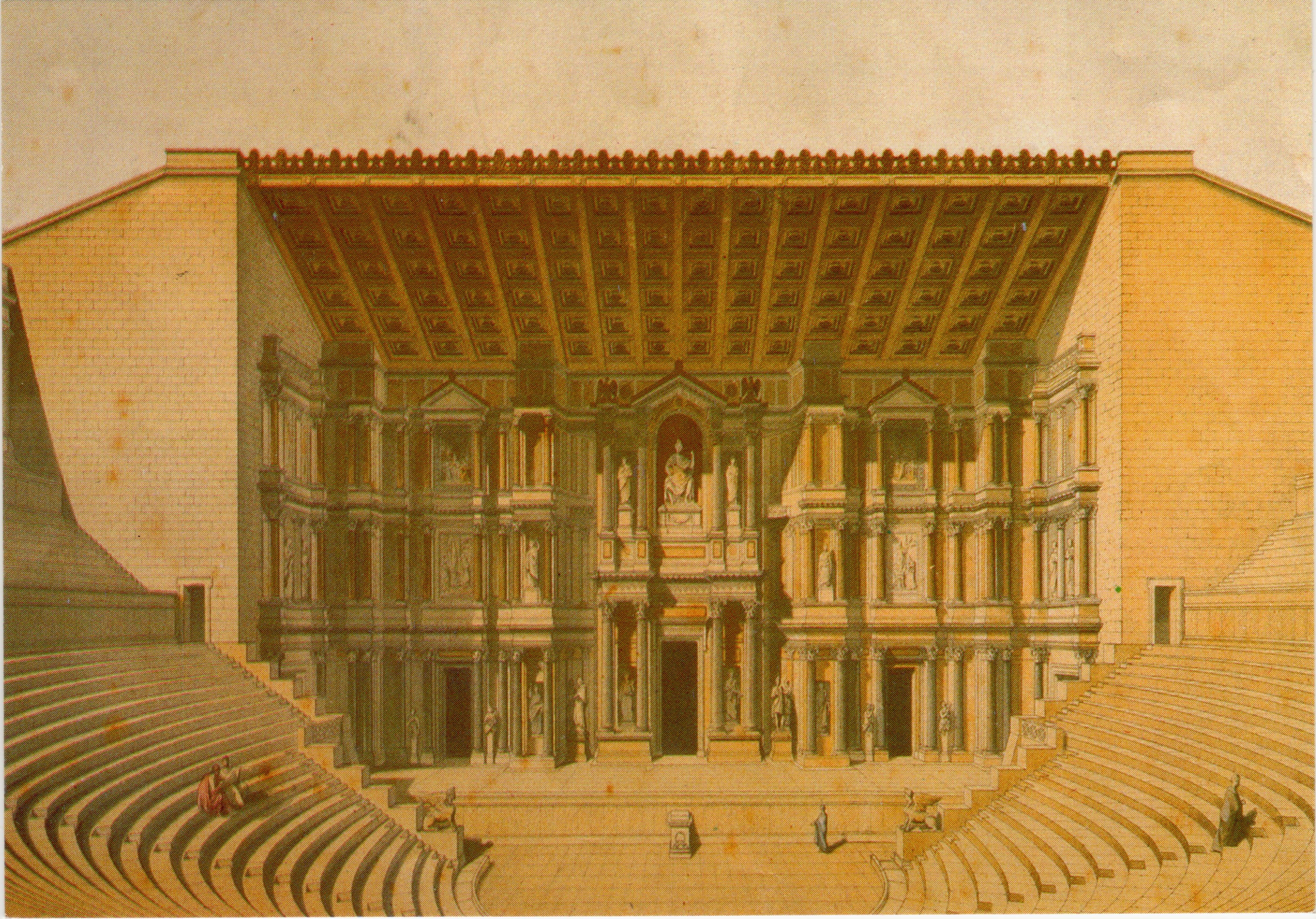
Postcard of the restored Roman theatre in Orange

Auguste Nicolas Caristie (6 December 1783 in Avallon – 5 December 1862 in Paris) was a French architect. He is best known for his restorations of public monuments.

== Biography ==
He was part of a long line of architects; originally from Italy. His father, Jacques-Nicolas Caristie (1747-1817), and his granduncle, Michel-Ange Caristie (1689-1760), were both well-known architects in Avallon. After studying with his father, he went to Paris, where he studied in the workshops of Antoine Vaudoyer and Charles Percier.

In 1813, his plans for a city hall won him the Prix de Rome. His stay in Italy would last for seven years. While there, he studied the restorative work being done in Pozzuoli, on what was then believed to be the Temple of Serapis, but has since been identified as the macellum (marketplace).

His first major project after returning to France came in 1823, when the Restoration government commissioned him to restore the Triumphal Arch of Orange. When this was completed, he began work on the restoration of the Roman Theatre of Orange.

This was followed by another government commission, for a mausoleum to honor the counter-revolutionary soldiers who were killed at the Battle of Quiberon. This led to his appointment as Inspector-General of public buildings in 1829. Later, he served as vice-president of the Commission of Historic Monuments.

He was elected to the Académie des Beaux-Arts in 1840 and took Seat #4 for architecture, succeeding Jean-Nicolas Huyot. His last major project was restoring the chapel at the Château d'Anet, in which he was occupied from 1844 to 1851. He was elected Conseil Général for the Département of the Seine in 1860.

His older brother, Philippe Joseph Marie Caristie, a chief engineer for roads and bridges, participated in the Egyptian campaigns of Napoleon.
