= Vaucluse's 4th constituency =

Constituency of the National Assembly of France

4th constituency of Vaucluse
- inline Constituency of the National Assembly of France

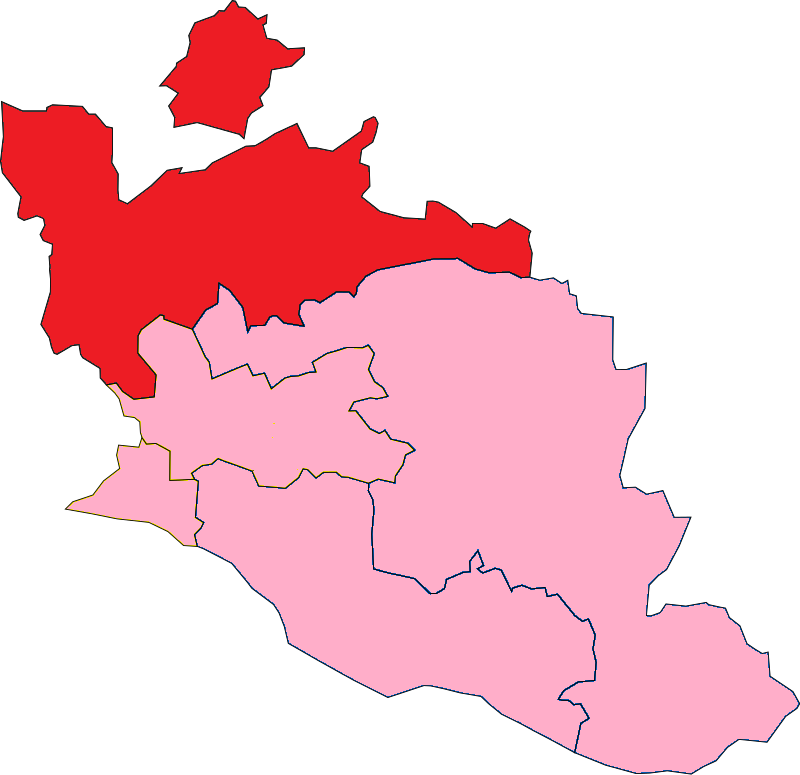
- Vaucluse's 4th Constituency shown within the Vaucluse
- Deputy: Marie-France Lorho; LS
- Department: Vaucluse
- Cantons: Beaumes-de-Venise, Bollène, Malaucène, Orange Est, Orange Ouest, Vaison-la-Romaine, Valréas
- Registered voters: 88,777

The 4th constituency of the Vaucluse (French: Quatrième circonscription de Vaucluse) is a French legislative constituency in the Vaucluse département. Like the other 576 French constituencies, it elects one MP using the two-round system, with a run-off if no candidate receives over 50% of the vote in the first round.

== Description ==
The 4th constituency of the Vaucluse lies in the north of the constituency is centred on the town of Orange. It also includes the enclave commune of Valréas, which is completely surrounded by Drôme.

In recent years the constituency has favoured right wing candidates including Jacques Bompard founder and sole deputy of the Ligue du Sud, until his replacement.

== Assembly members ==
Election	Member	Party
1988	Jean Gatel	PS
1993	Thierry Mariani	RPR
1997	Thierry Mariani	RPR
2002	Thierry Mariani	UMP
2007	Thierry Mariani	UMP
2012	Jacques Bompard	LS
2017	Jacques Bompard	LS
2017	Marie-France Lorho	LS
2022	Marie-France Lorho	LS
2024	Marie-France Lorho	RN

== Election results ==
=== 2024 ===
Legislative Election 2024: Vaucluse's 4th constituency
Party	Candidate	Votes	%	±%
RE (Ensemble)	Lise Chauvot	10,449	17.27	−8.00
REC	Marie-Claude Bompard	2,125	3.51	n/a
RN	Marie-France Lorho	30,192	49.89	+8.88
LR	David Marseille	2,685	4.44	−3.23
DIV	Anne-Marie Hautant	729	1.20	n/a
UDI	Bruno Coulon	1,893	3.13	n/a
LO	Nicolas Petillot	556	0.92	n/a
LFI (NFP)	Monia Galvez	11,887	19.64	+1.50
Turnout		60,516	96.92	+50.24
Registered electors		90,634		
2nd round result
RN	Marie-France Lorho	35,853	65.43	+8.46
LFI	Monia Galvez	18,946	34.57	n/a
Turnout		54,799	88.92	+42.86
Registered electors		90,653		
RN hold				

=== 2022 ===
Legislative Election 2022: Vaucluse's 4th constituency
Party	Candidate	Votes	%	±%
LS	Marie-France Lorho	16,850	41.01	+21.86
LREM (Ensemble)	Violaine Richard	10,381	25.27	+0.03
LFI (NUPÉS)	Monia Galvez	7,453	18.14	+1.20
LR (UDC)	Roger Rossin	3,152	7.67	−4.30
DVE	Betty Carvou	1,062	2.59	+1.11
Others	N/A	2,185	5.33	
Turnout		41,083	46.68	−1.25
2nd round result
LS	Marie-France Lorho	21,883	56.97	+6.60
LREM (Ensemble)	Violaine Richard	16,529	43.03	−6.60
Turnout		38,412	46.06	+3.49
LS hold				

=== 2017 ===
Legislative Election 2017: Vaucluse's 4th constituency
Party	Candidate	Votes	%	±%
LREM	Carole Normani	10,744	25.24	
LS	Jacques Bompard	8,152	19.15	
FN	Catherine Candela	7,711	18.12	
LR	Jean-François Perilhou	5,096	11.97	
LFI	Farid Faryssy	3,458	8.13	
PS	Marlène Thibaud	1,668	3.92	
DVD	Myriam Henri Gros	1,621	3.81	
PCF	Fabienne Haloui	1,094	2.57	
EELV	Serge Marolleau	986	2.32	
Others	N/A	2,029		
Turnout		42,559	47.93	
2nd round result
LS	Jacques Bompard	19,034	50.37	
LREM	Carole Normani	18,756	49.63	
Turnout		37,790	42.57	
LS hold				

=== 2012 ===
Legislative Election 2012: Vaucluse's 4th constituency
Party	Candidate	Votes	%	±%
PS	Pierre Meffre	13,125	25.16	
LS	Jacques Bompard	12,266	23.51	
UMP	Bénédicte Martin	10,667	20.45	
FN	Annie-France Soulet	8,495	16.28	
FG	Fabienne Haloui	3,369	6.46	
DVD	Paul Durieu	2,180	4.18	
Others	N/A	2,063		
Turnout		52,165	60.60	
2nd round result
LS	Jacques Bompard	29,738	58.77	
PS	Pierre Meffre	20,861	41.23	
Turnout		50,599	58.71	
LS gain from UMP				

=== 2007 ===
Legislative Election 2007: Vaucluse's 4th constituency
Party	Candidate	Votes	%	±%
UMP	Thierry Mariani	21,125	41.36	
PS	Pierre Meffre	10,388	20.34	
MPF	Jacques Bompard	10,072	19.72	
MoDem	Roland Roticci	2,451	4.80	
FN	Emmanuelle Gueguen	2,268	4.44	
PCF	Fabienne Haloui	1,474	2.89	
Others	N/A	3,295		
Turnout		52,108	62.89	
2nd round result
UMP	Thierry Mariani	28,462	60.18	
PS	Pierre Meffre	18,835	39.82	
Turnout		50,285	60.69	
UMP hold				

=== 2002 ===
Legislative Election 2002: Vaucluse's 4th constituency
Party	Candidate	Votes	%	±%
UMP	Thierry Mariani	18,471	35.23	
FN	Jacques Bompard	17,855	34.06	
PS	Jean-Pierre Lambertin	13,135	25.06	
Others	N/A	2,962		
Turnout		53,602	70.26	
2nd round result
UMP	Thierry Mariani	26,434	57.62	
FN	Jacques Bompard	19,439	42.38	
Turnout		50,251	65.87	
UMP hold				

=== 1997 ===
Legislative Election 1997: Vaucluse's 4th constituency
Party	Candidate	Votes	%	±%
RPR	Thierry Mariani	14,909	29.42	
FN	Jacques Bompard	14,591	28.79	
PS	Jean-Pierre Lambertin	11,603	22.89	
PCF	Pierre Mercier	4,459	8.80	
LV	Serge Boyer	1,712	3.38	
DVD	Jean-Claude Thiodet	1,131	2.23	
Others	N/A	2,276		
Turnout		52,974	73.49	
2nd round result
RPR	Thierry Mariani	21,546	38.87	
PS	Jean-Pierre Lambertin	19,825	35.76	
FN	Jacques Bompard	14,062	25.37	
Turnout		57,077	79.20	
RPR hold				
