= League of the South (France) =

French political party

League of the South Ligue du Sud
- President: Jacques Bompard
- Founded: 23 June 2010
- Split from: Movement for France
- Headquarters: 574 Clos Cavalier, 84100 Orange, Vaucluse
- Ideology: French nationalism; Social conservatism; National conservatism; Euroscepticism; Poujadism; Localism
- Political position: Far-right
- National Assembly: 0 / 577
- Senate: 0 / 348
- European Parliament: 0 / 74
- Presidencies of regional councils: 0 / 17
- Regional councillors: 0 / 1,758
- Presidencies of departmental councils: 0 / 101
- Departmental councillors: 2 / 4,108

Website
- liguedusud.fr

The League of the South (French: Ligue du Sud; LS) is a far-right political party in France founded by Jacques Bompard with former members of the National Front in 2010. The party is established in Provence-Alpes-Côte d'Azur, particularly in the department of Vaucluse. Orange, the department's second most populated commune, as well as Piolenc, both have League of the South mayors. The party currently has one representative in the National Assembly: Marie-France Lorho, who sits for the 4th constituency of Vaucluse.

== History ==
After internal tensions with the leadership of the Front National (FN), a group of politicians from Provence, including Marie-France Stirbois, Jacques Bompard, and Patrick Louis, broke away from the FN in 2005 to join the Movement for France (MPF). Stirbois died in April 2006 from cancer. Bompard's association L'Esprit Public, which had been involved with the organisation of conferences since 2003, hosted in August 2008 a party conference featuring speakers from various far-right groups the likes of Bernard Antony (AGRIF), Nicolas Bay (MNR), Jacques Cordonnier (Alsace d'Abord), Philippe Vardon (Nissa Rebela), Laurent Gouteron (Bloc Identitaire), or Jeanne Smits (Présent). The name inspired by Lega Nord.

On 29 January 2010, the League of the South (LS) was officially declared to the Journal Officiel; the LS list (Front Régional-Nissa Rebela-PDF-MNR) won 2.69% of the vote in the 2010 regional election. The following 23 June, a party executive was appointed.

In the 2012 legislative election, party president Jacques Bompard was elected Member of Parliament. In the 2014 municipal election, Bompard was reelected Mayor of Orange; his wife Marie-Claude Bompard was reelected in Bollène; Louis Driey was reelected in Piolenc. Camaret-sur-Aigues elected LS candidate Philippe de Beauregard.

== Ideology ==
Leader and former member of the National Assembly Jacques Bompard, who has stated his belief in the Great Replacement theory, has called resisting against its application a priority. Bompard is also politically close to the national party Reconquête, led by 2022 presidential candidate and former journalist Éric Zemmour. On February 14, 2023, the Global Project Against Hate and Extremism (GPAHE) released a report in which it classified the League of the South as an "anti-muslim," "anti-immigrant," and "anti-LGBTQ+" group.
