= Éric Teyssier =

French academic and historian (born 1962)

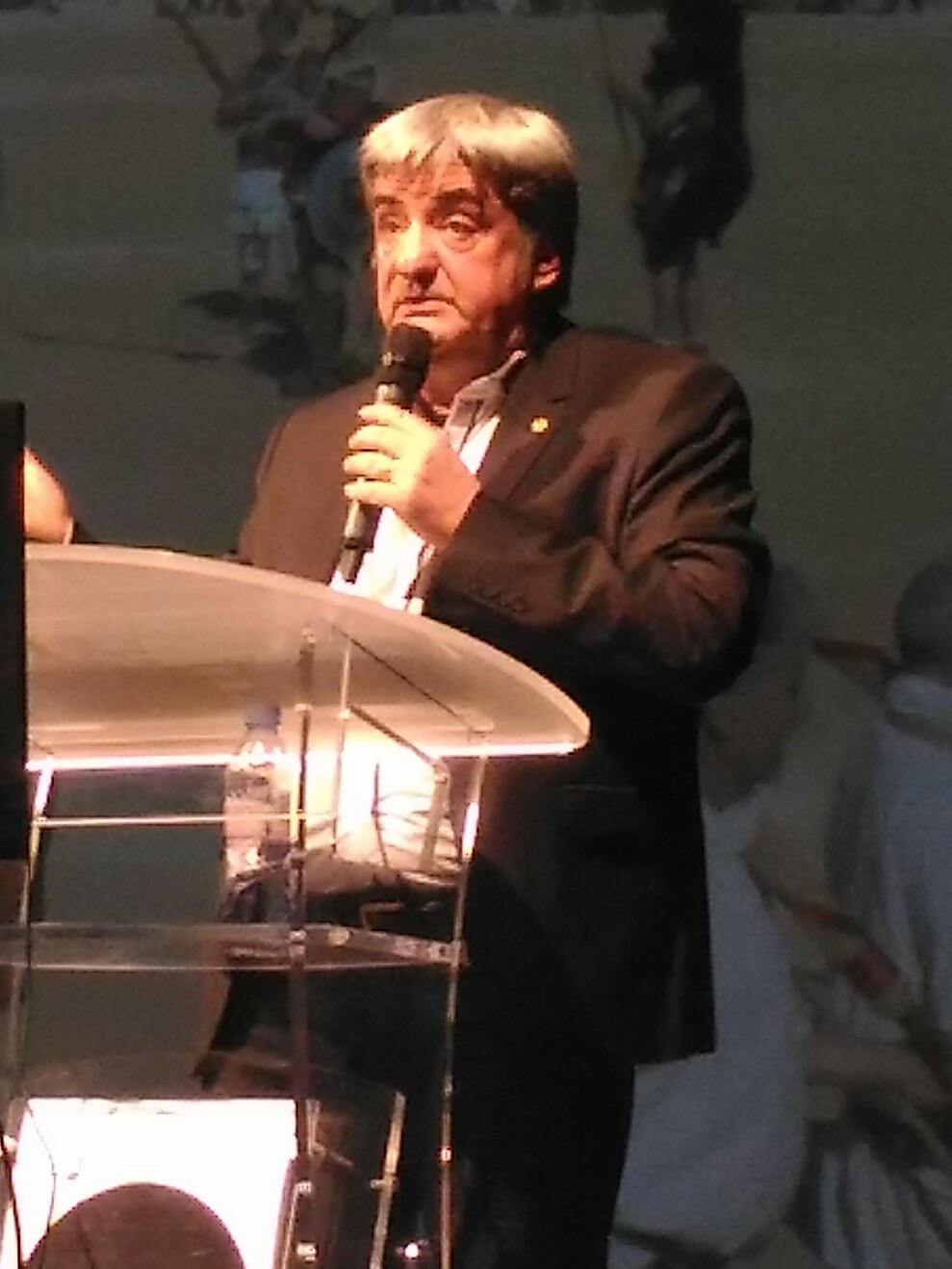

Éric Teyssier (born 30 December 1962) is a French academic and historian. After he obtained his doctorate on the sale of the Biens nationaux in Ardèche, he published numerous articles on the economic and social history of the French Revolution and the first French Empire. Through living history and experimental archeology, he became interested in the Roman period and especially with the gladiators, of which he became one of the specialists.

== Biography ==
Éric Teyssier is agrégé in history, a graduate in history of art and archeology, as well as in political sciences, he holds a doctorate in modern history. In this context, he carried out a thorough research of critical history on the sale of Biens nationaux in France during the Revolution.

He teaches history of art and archeology at the University of Montpellier III. A lecturer in history at the University of Nîmes since 2003, he became habilited to conduct research in ancient history in 2008. This research work was published in 2009 by Actes Sud under the title La mort en face. Le dossier Gladiateur.

Very involved in the field of experimental archeology, his other field of historical research is the ancient period. He specialized particularly on Roman gladiators. From 2007 to 2012, he was the founding president of the "Ars Maiorum" experimental archeology association, whose field of action was the reconstruction of ancient combat techniques. Author of scientific articles, he has also published two books on gladiators and two biographies devoted to Spartacus and Pompey. In 2014, he published a synthesis on the history of ancient Nîmes. With Éric Dars, he also co-wrote several children's history books.

As part of experimental archeology and living history, Eric Teyssier also conducted various pageants in collaboration with Fabien Faizant: Arausio (2001), La légende de Sacrovir (2002) at the Roman Theatre of Orange, then La légende de Gracillis (2003) and 800 ans de gladiature (2004). In December 2012, the historical show "Spartacus and the roman legion" was présented in Los Angeles.

Since 2010, he has been a historical advisor, screenwriter and co-organizer of the Grands jeux romains at Nîmes.

== Books and articles ==
- 1996: La question des biens nationaux à travers le cas Ardéchois, thesis, ANRT
- 2000: Bernard Bodinier, Éric Teyssier, L'évènement le plus important de la révolution française, la vente des biens nationaux, Paris, Société des études robespierristes et comité des travaux historiques et scientifiques
- La vente des biens nationaux et la question agraire, aspects législatifs et politiques, 1789-1795, in Rives nord-méditerranéennes, Paysans et pouvoirs local, le temps des révolutions Read online
- Fabre, Patrick; Lebaudy, Guillaume; Orange, Aimé; Reveleau, Louis; Teyssier, Éric; Sauguet, Fanny; Wolff, Axel; Minard, Roger (2010). Le Mérinos d'Arles;Passion de bergers. Marseille: Images en manœuvres. ISBN 978-2-8499-5169-9.
- 2007: Nîmes, ville antique, Histoire antique, July–August, n° 32.
- 2006: B. Lopez, Gladiateurs. Des sources à l’expérimentation, Errances
- 2010: Histoire Antique & Médiévale hors série n° 23 Les gladiateurs
- with Éric Dars and Vincent Caut (illustrations), La Grèce Antique à petit pas, éd. Actes Sud Junior.
- with Éric Dars, Les Romains à petits pas, Actes Sud Junior (translated into Italian and Korean)
- with Éric Dars, Pirates et corsaires à petits pas, Actes Sud Junior.
- 2009: Teyssier, Éric. La Mort en face ;Le Dossier gladiateurs. Actes Sud.
- 2012: Spartacus. Entre le mythe et l'histoire, ISBN 978-2-262-03951-6.
- 2013: Pompée. L'anti-César, Perrin
- 2014: Nîmes la romaine, une cité au carrefour des civilisations, Alcide
- 2015: Les secrets de la Rome antique, Perrin
- 2015: Chroniques romaines I, Alcide
- 2016: (texts), Thierry Vezon (photos), Le pont du Gard, Alcide,(bilingual English–French edition)
