= Caderousse =

- Commune
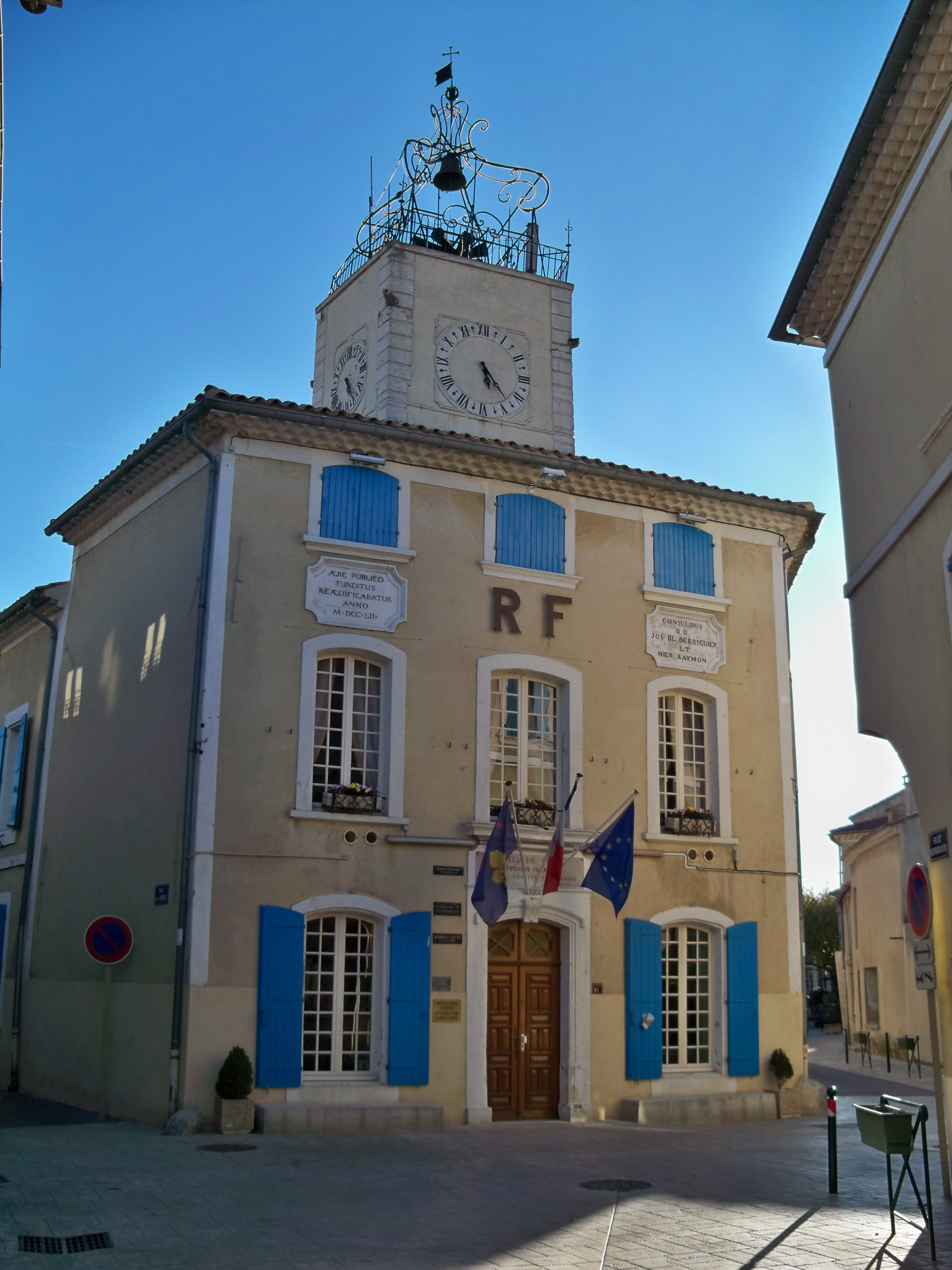
- The town hall of Caderousse

- Coat of arms
- Location of Caderousse
- Location within France Location within Provence-Alpes-Côte d'Azur
- Coordinates: 44°06′13″N 4°45′25″E
- Country: France
- Region: Provence-Alpes-Côte d'Azur
- Department: Vaucluse
- Arrondissement: Carpentras
- Canton: Orange
- Intercommunality: CC Pays d'Orange en Provence

Government
  - Mayor (2020–2026): Christophe Reynier-Duval
- Area^{1}: 32.39 km^{2} (12.51 sq mi)
- Elevation: 27 m (89 ft)
- Highest elevation: 40 m (130 ft)
- Lowest elevation: 23 m (75 ft)
- Population (2023): 2,493
  - Density: 76.97/km^{2} (199.3/sq mi)
- Time zone: UTC+01:00 (CET)
  - Summer (DST): UTC+02:00 (CEST)
- INSEE/Postal code: 84027 /84860
- ^{1} French Land Register data, which excludes lakes, ponds, glaciers > 1 km^{2} (0.386 sq mi or 247 acres) and river estuaries.

Caderousse (French pronunciation: [kadʁus]; Occitan: Cadarossa) is a commune in the Vaucluse department in the Provence-Alpes-Côte d'Azur region in southeastern France.

Caderousse is located 6 km (3.7 mi) west of Orange on the river Rhône.

== Population ==
Historical population
Year	Pop.	±% p.a.
1968	1,667	—
1975	2,027	+2.83%
1982	2,007	−0.14%
1990	2,260	+1.50%
1999	2,496	+1.11%
2007	2,712	+1.04%
2012	2,738	+0.19%
2017	2,667	−0.52%
2023	2,493	−1.12%
Source: INSEE

== See also ==
- Communes of the Vaucluse department
