= Le cadastre d'Orange =

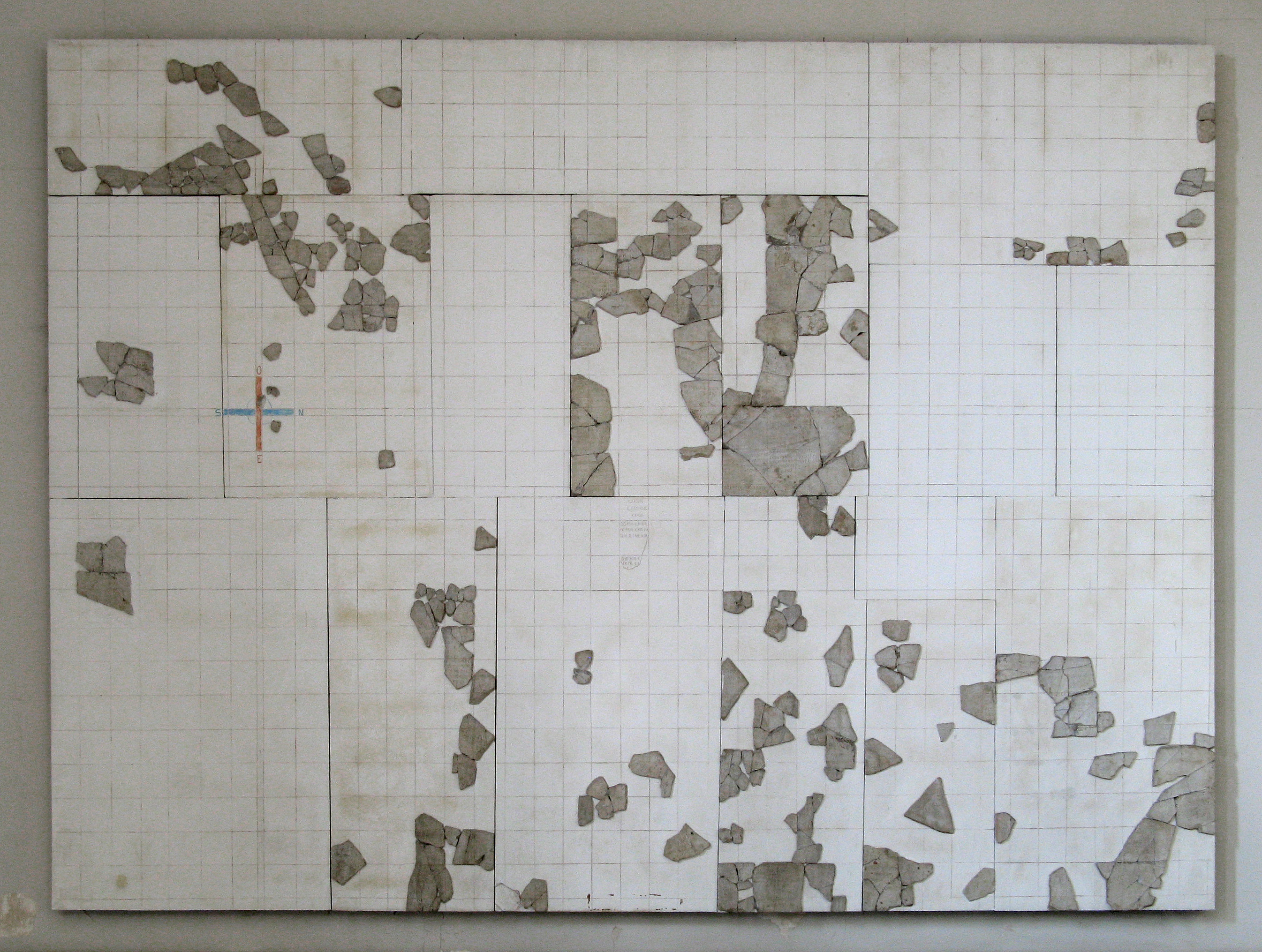
Overview of cadastre B, which covers the area along the Rhone north of Orange

Le cadastre d'Orange or the cadaster of Orange is an ancient Roman era map found at the French city of Orange. The plan is carved in stone and shows the land registration (or cadastre) for the area between Orange and Nice during the 2nd century.

== Purpose ==
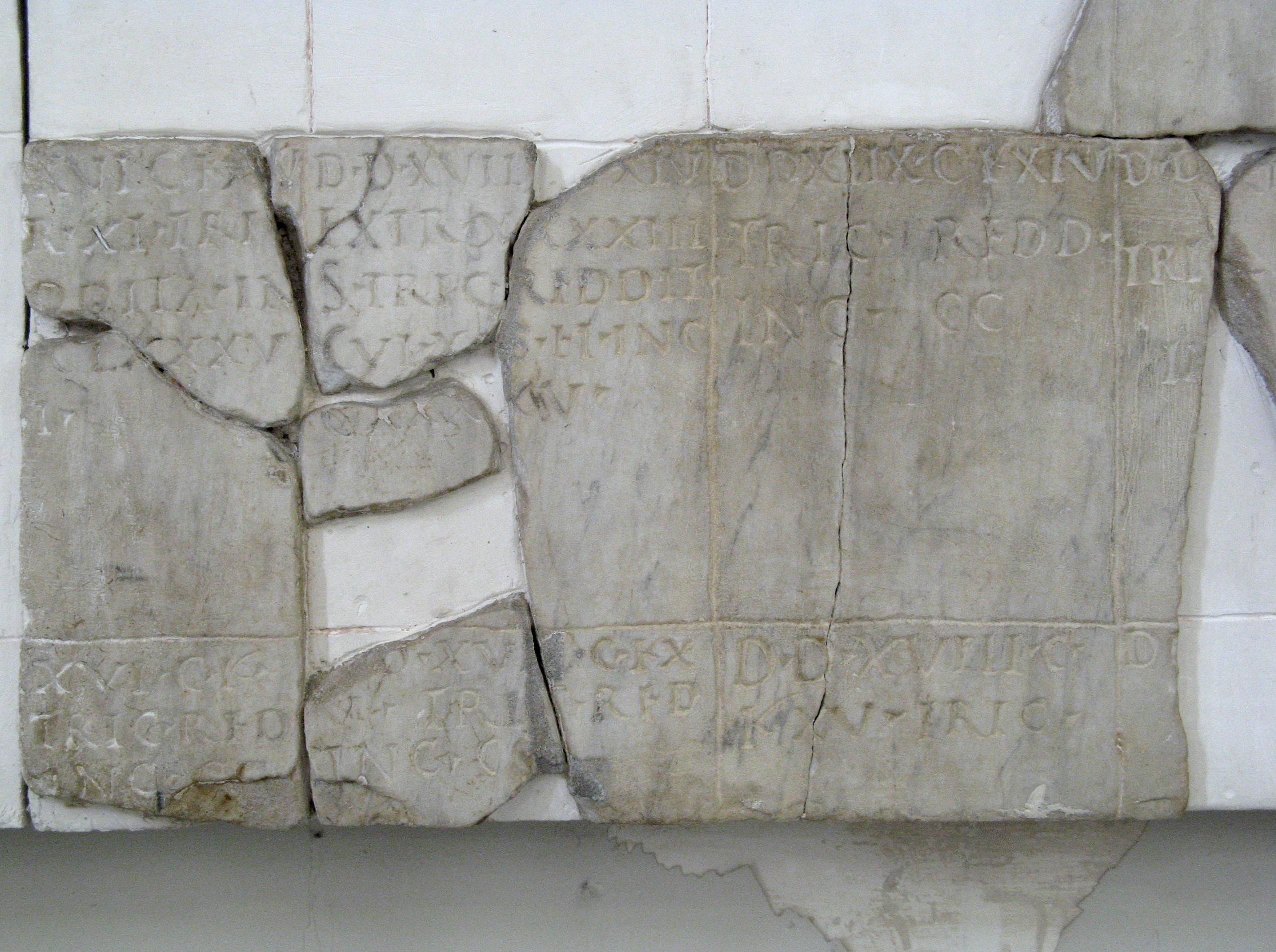
Detail of cadastre B, fragment 135

During the reign of Vespasian he ordered the land registry around Orange to be restored. Part of this was the creation of a Cadaster, which remains today. These Roman cadastres are the best preserved in the world. Three copies of rural land registers, carved in stone, were discovered in 1949 though in a large number of fragments. The purpose of the maps was to display in the city, so that individuals could identify and restore public lands that they had appropriated. The goal was to identify the undistributed lots, properties of the Roman state, which appeared to have been unduly occupied. Land lots were prioritized for land for veterans, and other, poorer land remained community property. Thus was facilitated colonization and development of the soil, to the detriment of the Celtic inhabitants.

== Centuration ==
When The Roman Legio II Augusta founded the colony of Arausio (Orange) they used the traditional method of Centuriation. Parallel lines separated by 708 meters, intersecting to form centuries of 50 hectares. This was a rapid method of allocating land to settlers and allowed the agricultural land to orientate with the main roads of the new town. It was used in conjunction with, and as an extension to the Hippodamian planning of the city.

== Coverage ==
In the land registry the territory around Châteaurenard marks the middle of the maps; the land registry B, the most complete, covers the northern part of Orange and goes back to Montelimar, it extends east to the site of the Dentelles; the crossing of these two axes is the center of Bollène.

Archaeological discoveries still take place thanks to the excavations related to work on the town. The latest, north of the town near the Fourchevieilles district unearthed a necropolis that was the subject of an exhibition at the municipal museum, and the Roman houses were mapped using the building project related to the triumphal arch.

== See also ==
- Legio II Augusta
- Orange (Vaucluse)
