= Marie-France Lorho =

French politician (born 1964)

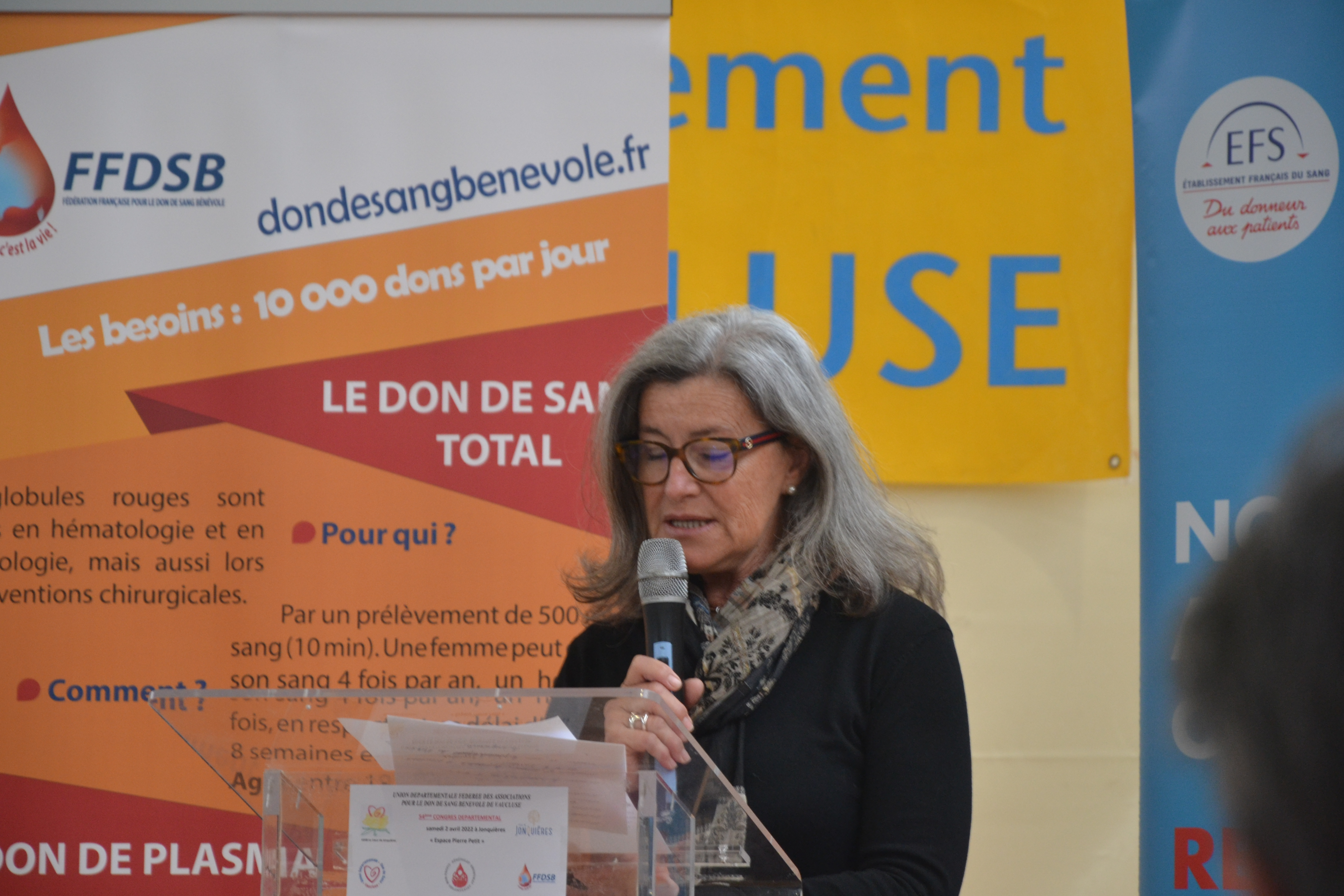
- Lorho in April 2022.

Member of the National Assembly for Vaucluse's 4th constituency
- Incumbent
- Assumed office 22 August 2017
- Preceded by: Jacques Bompard

Personal details
- Born: 15 December 1964 (age 61) Colmar, France
- Party: RN (since 2022)
- Other political affiliations: LS (until 2022)

Marie-France Lorho (born 15 December 1964) is a French politician from the National Rally serving as the member of the National Assembly for the 4th constituency of Vaucluse since 2017. She was a member of the League of the South (LS) until 2022, consequently being its sole representative in Parliament.

== Career ==
The daughter of General Raymond Lorho (1924–2014), Marie-France Lorho was active in local politics in Orange prior to her tenure in the National Assembly. She is close to Mayor Jacques Bompard and was his substitute in the 2017 legislative election. Following Bompard's resignation to focus on his mayorship, Lorho became a parliamentarian.

In February 2018, alongside Emmanuelle Ménard, she proposed a bill which would recognise the 1790s killings in Vendée by troops under the command of the National Convention as war crimes, crimes against humanity and genocide.

She stood for re-election in the 2022 French legislative election, with support from National Rally. She was elected in the second round over the Ensemble Citoyens candidate. Briefly after her 2022 reelection, she was excluded from the League of the South and joined the National Rally.
