= Canton of Orange =

Coordinates: 44.14°N 4.81°E

- Canton
- Situation of the canton of Orange in the department of Vaucluse
- Country: France
- Region: Provence-Alpes-Côte d'Azur
- Department: Vaucluse
- No. of communes: {{{nbcomm}}}
- Population (2023): 37,917
- INSEE code: 8411

The canton of Orange is an administrative division of the Vaucluse department, in southeastern France. It was created at the French canton reorganisation which came into effect in March 2015. Its seat is in Orange.

It consists of the following communes:

1. Caderousse
2. Orange
3. Piolenc
