= Jacques Bompard =

French politician (born 1943)

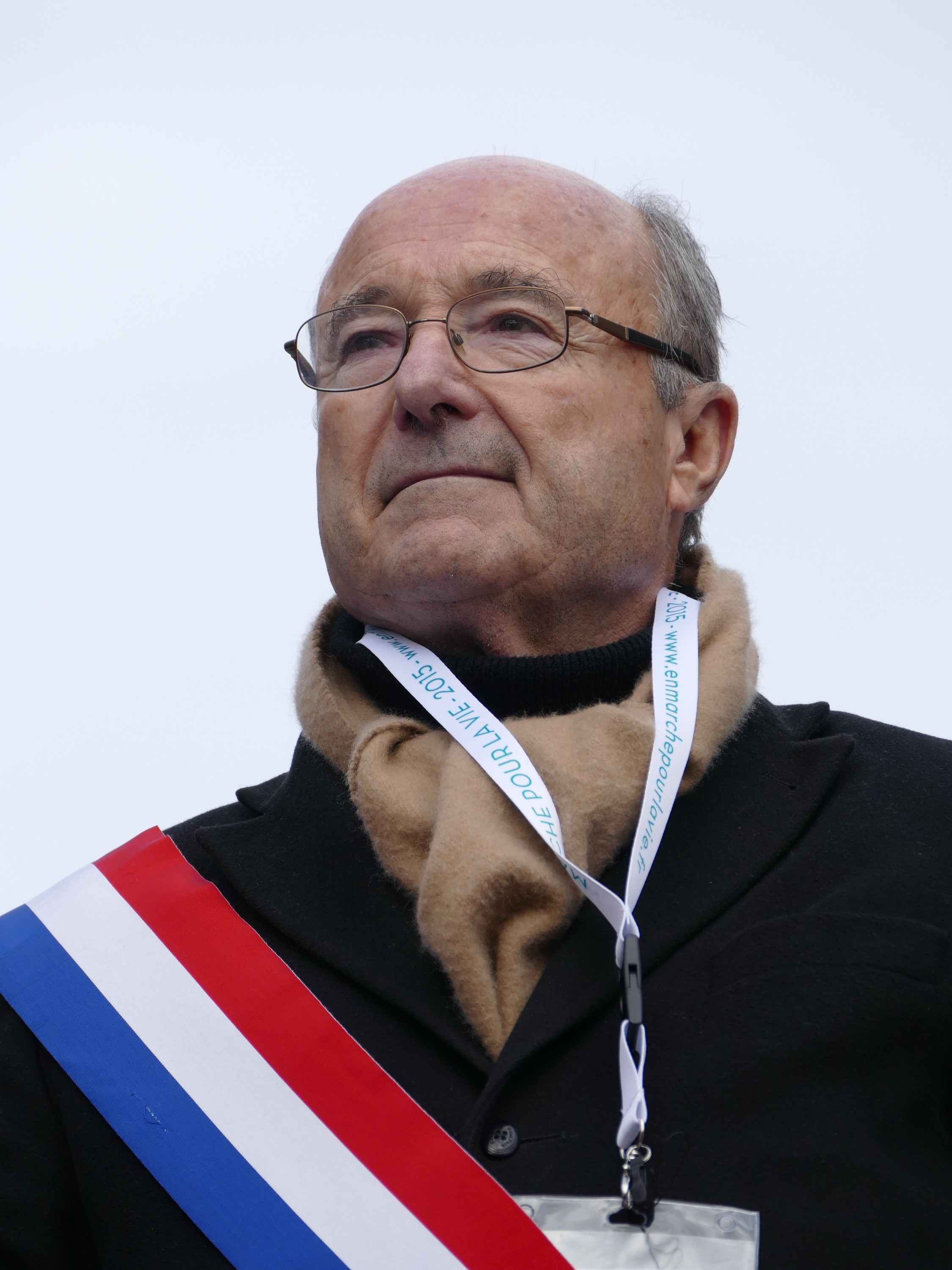
- Bompard in 2015

President of the League of the South
- Incumbent
- Assumed office 23 June 2010
- Preceded by: Position established

Mayor of Orange
- In office 25 June 1995 – 30 November 2021
- Preceded by: Alain Labé
- Succeeded by: Yann Bompard

Member of the National Assembly for Vaucluse
- In office 20 June 2012 – 21 August 2017
- Preceded by: Thierry Mariani
- Succeeded by: Marie-France Lorho
- Constituency: 4th
- In office 2 April 1986 – 14 May 1988
- Constituency: At-large

Personal details
- Born: 24 February 1943 (age 83) Montpellier, France
- Party: League of the South (2010–present)
- Other political affiliations: National Front (1972–2005); Movement for France (2005–2010)
- Education: University of Montpellier
- Profession: Dentist

Jacques Bompard (French pronunciation: [ʒak bɔ̃paʁ]; born 24 February 1943) is a French politician who has presided over the League of the South (LS) since he co-founded in 2010. He served as Mayor of Orange from 1995 to 2021 and a member of the National Assembly for Vaucluse from 1986 to 1988, elected at-large, before returning from 2012 until 2017, when he represented its 4th constituency.

== Early life ==
Jacques Bompard was born on 24 February 1943 in Montpellier. He studied dentistry at the University of Montpellier.

== Career ==
Bompard was first elected Mayor of Orange in 1995 before he was reelected in 2001, 2008, 2014 and 2020. In 2021, he resigned the mayorship following his conviction for illegally taking advantage of his position. He was succeeded by his son, First Deputy Mayor Yann Bompard.

He was originally a member of Jean-Marie Le Pen's National Front (FN), but left the party in 2005. He joined Philippe de Villiers's Movement for France (MPF) later that year. In 2010 he left the MPF, claiming that the party had grown too close to the presidential Union for a Popular Movement (UMP) party. Following the 2010 regional election, Bompard founded the League of the South (LS), a far-right party close to the Bloc identitaire.

He was elected as a member of the National Assembly for Vaucluse in 1986 on a National Front at-large list. He was reelected in 2012 and 2017 in the department's 4th constituency; he was succeeded by his substitute Marie-France Lorho soon thereafter following his resignation to focus on his mayorship. Bompard also served in the Regional Council of Provence-Alpes-Côte d'Azur from 1986 to 2002 and General Council of Vaucluse from 2002 to 2012, where he represented the canton of Orange-Ouest.

Ahead of the 2022 presidential election, Bompard was a vocal supporter of a potential candidacy of Éric Zemmour. After Zemmour officialised his candidacy, Bompard expressed his support for the newly-founded Reconquête party led by Zemmour while remaining a member of the League of the South.

== Personal life ==
Jacques Bompard is married to Marie-Claude Bompard (née Pelletier), who has served as Mayor of Bollène since 2008.

== Bibliography ==
- L'Arme alimentaire - Réponse à l'assassinat prémédité du monde rural (with Marie-Claude Bompard, Editions du Cerce)
- France, ton agriculture doit vivre (Editions du Cerce, 1987)
- Main basse sur l'agriculture (Editions du Cerce, 1989)
- Voyage autour de la femme, d'Eve à Benazir (with Marie-Claude Bompard, Barthélémy, 1991)
- Un maire au créneau. Orange, une ville gérée autrement (Editions Nationales, 1997)
- Les Chemins de la victoire (with Philippe Randa, Deterna, 2002)
- Le Pen contre le Front National (2005)
