= Chorégies d'Orange =

Annual opera festival in France

Coordinates: 44.1358°N 4.8088°E

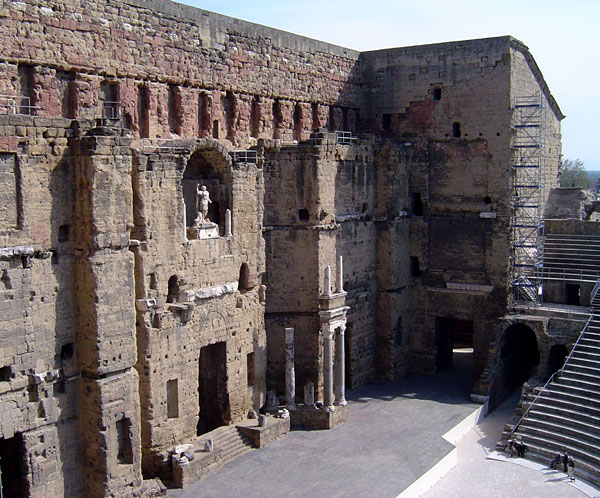
Roman theatre at Orange, France

The Chorégies d'Orange is a summer opera festival held each August in Orange located about 21 kilometres north of Avignon in southern France. Performances are presented in the ancient Roman theatre, the Théâtre Antique d'Orange, the original stage wall of which has remained intact, creating a semi-circular auditorium which seats 9,000.

A festival began in Orange in 1860 and was held periodically, but it was only after the Roman theatre was restored in 1869 that it became the location of a popular “Roman Festival” which celebrated the glory of Rome and included a performance of Méhul’s opera, Joseph. All the major players of the French classical stage appeared in the Orange festivals, including Sarah Bernhardt who played “Phèdre” in 1903.

In 1902, the festival was given a new name, the “Chorégies,” and it was planned to take place annually. The name comes from the Greek χορηγός khorêgós "choir leader." Until 1969, the Chorégies consisted of plays, alternating with musical works, opera and symphonies. However, after that date, Orange became solely an opera festival and theatrical works were performed at Avignon.

In 1971, the “New Chorégies” began, with a format not unlike the present one where only about six performances are given during the month-long festival, typically two performances of two operas along with a recital or concert. It quickly became an international success with many major international singers appearing.

== See also ==
- List of opera festivals
