= Hôtel de Ville, Orange =

Town hall in Orange, France

Hôtel de Ville
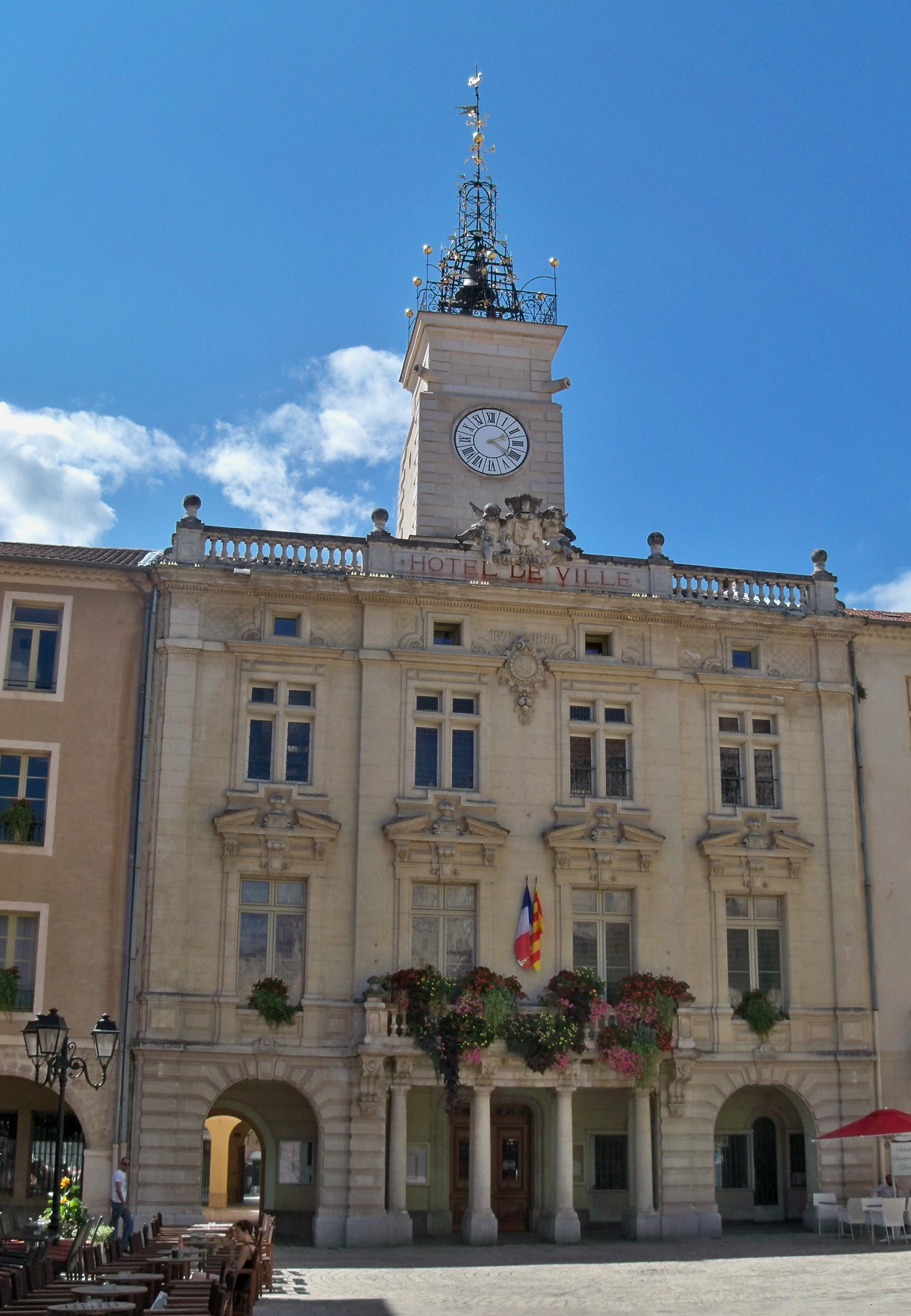
- The main frontage of the Hôtel de Ville in August 2010

General information
- Type: City hall
- Architectural style: Neoclassical style
- Location: Orange, France
- Coordinates: 44.1375°N 4.8072°E
- Completed: 1671

Monument historique
- Official name: Hôtel de ville
- Type: Inscrit
- Designated: 1907
- Reference no.: PA00082105

The Hôtel de Ville (French pronunciation: [otɛl də vil], City Hall) is a municipal building in Orange, Vaucluse, in southern France, standing on Place Georges Clemenceau. It was designated a monument historique by the French government in 1907.

== History ==
The consuls established their first town hall in a building on the corner of Rue Notre-Dame on what is now Rue de Ancien Hôtel de Ville in 1624.

Previously under the control of the House of Orange-Nassau, the Principality of Orange was ceded to France under the Treaty of Utrecht in 1713. In this context, the consuls decided to acquire a more substantial municipal building. The building they selected was the Hôtel de Lubières on the west side of the market square (now Place Georges Clemenceau). The building had been commissioned as a private house by the Laurens family. It was designed in the neoclassical style, built in ashlar stone and was completed in 1671.

In 1679, the building was sold to Frédéric de Langes de Lubières, who became president of the Parlement of Orange in 1684. After refusing to convert to the catholic faith, he died in a French prison in 1697. The house then passed to his son, François de Langes de Lubières who, also persecuted for his Protestant faith, fled to Geneva in Switzerland in 1702. The consuls then acquired the vacant property, which at that time had a large garden at the rear, in 1713.

The design involved a symmetrical main frontage of four bays facing onto the market square. The ground floor featured a two-bay arcade formed by four Doric order columns supporting an entablature and a balcony. The outer bays featured round headed openings with voussoirs and keystones. The building was fenestrated by cross-windows with triangular pediments on the first floor, by plain cross-windows on the second floor and by small square windows at attic level. There was a balustraded parapet at roof level. A square clock tower with a wrought iron belfry, commissioned to accommodate a bell recovered from the old town hall, was installed in the centre of the roof in 1715. Internally, the principal room was the Salle du Conseil (council chamber) which was decorated, in 1845, by a fine painting by Jules Varnier entitled "Rodolphe d'Aymard et la garde nationale d'Orange arrêtant les massacres d'Avignon, le 11 juin 1790" (Rodolphe d'Aymard and the national guard of Orange putting an end to the Avignon Massacres on 11 June 1790). The painting recalls the efforts of a future mayor of Orange, Rodolphe d'Aymard, supported by the national guard of Orange, to put an end to a massacre which took place at the Palais des Papes in Avignon during the Reign of Terror, part of the French Revolution.

In 1846, the demolition of a covered market hall in front of the building facilitated the opening-up of what is now Place Georges Clemenceau.
