= Piolenc =

- Commune
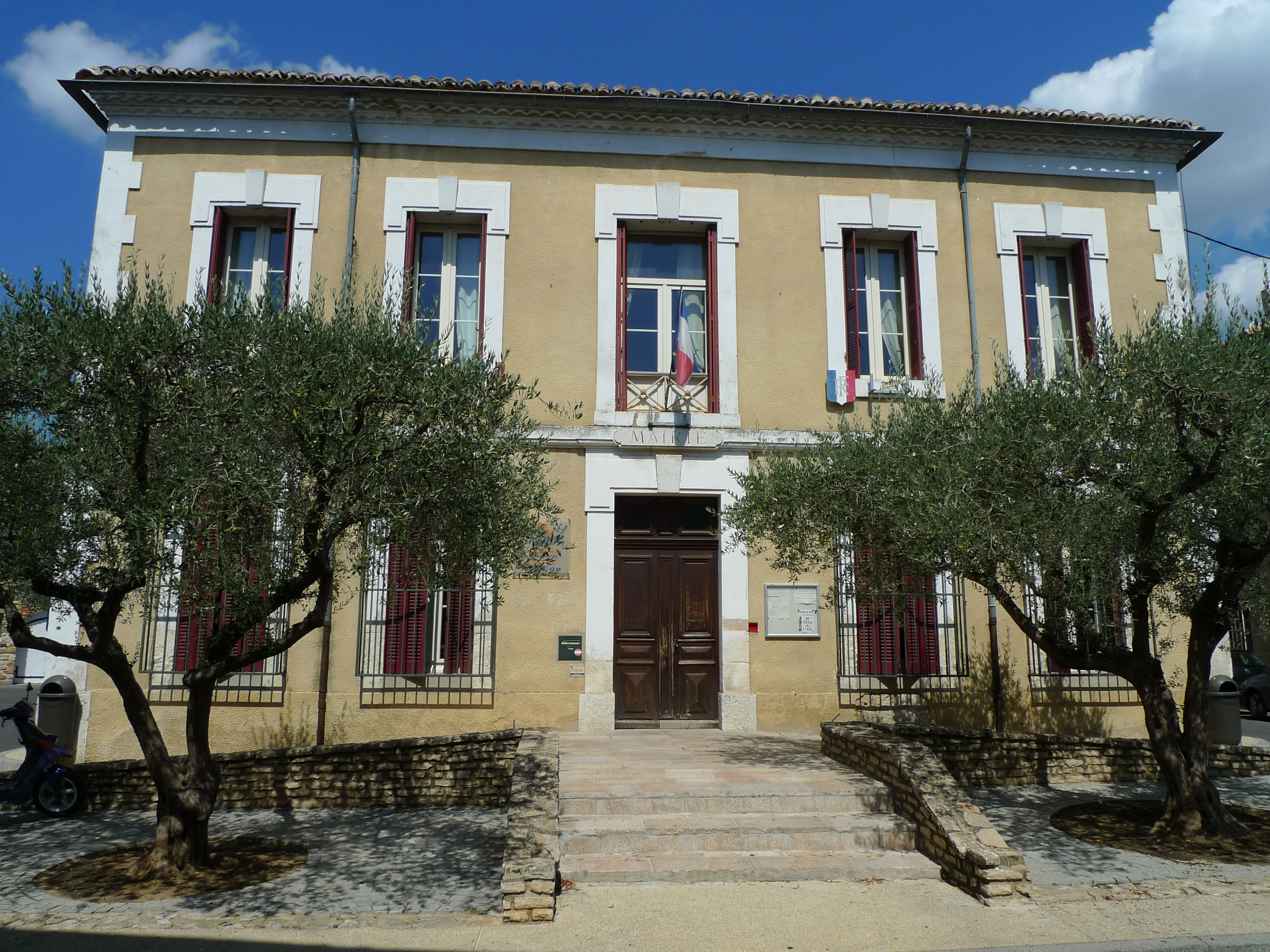
- Town hall

- Coat of arms
- Location of Piolenc
- Location within France Location within Provence-Alpes-Côte d'Azur
- Coordinates: 44°10′43″N 4°45′44″E
- Country: France
- Region: Provence-Alpes-Côte d'Azur
- Department: Vaucluse
- Arrondissement: Carpentras
- Canton: Orange

Government
  - Mayor (2020–2026): Louis Driey
- Area^{1}: 24.8 km^{2} (9.6 sq mi)
- Elevation: 47 m (154 ft)
- Highest elevation: 170 m (560 ft)
- Lowest elevation: 22 m (72 ft)
- Population (2023): 5,718
  - Density: 231/km^{2} (597/sq mi)
- Time zone: UTC+01:00 (CET)
  - Summer (DST): UTC+02:00 (CEST)
- INSEE/Postal code: 84091 /84420
- ^{1} French Land Register data, which excludes lakes, ponds, glaciers > 1 km^{2} (0.386 sq mi or 247 acres) and river estuaries.

Piolenc (French pronunciation: [pjɔlɛ̃k]; Occitan: Puegoulen) is a commune in the Vaucluse department in the Provence-Alpes-Côte d'Azur region in southeastern France.

Piolenc is located 6 km (3.7 mi) north of Orange, and about 27 km (17 mi) north of Avignon.

== History ==
Piolenc was the site of a Cluniac priory.

== Population ==
Historical population
| Year | Pop. | ±% p.a. |
|---|---|---|
| 1968 | 2,184 | — |
| 1975 | 2,594 | +2.49% |
| 1982 | 3,259 | +3.31% |
| 1990 | 3,830 | +2.04% |
| 1999 | 4,296 | +1.28% |
| 2007 | 4,548 | +0.72% |
| 2012 | 5,113 | +2.37% |
| 2017 | 5,253 | +0.54% |
| 2023 | 5,718 | +1.42% |
Source: INSEE

== Traditions ==
Wine is the main activity of this city, but the dominant besides of the agricultural production is the "French Provence garlic", as such the "garlic cultural festival" takes place every summer in August, during the last week-end.

== Personalities ==
Piolenc was the birthplace :

- Jean-Louis Trintignant (1930–2022), actor
- André-Philippe Corsin (1773–1854)

== Twin towns ==
Piolenc is twinned with:

- Kirchheim am Neckar, Germany
- Tecuci, Romania

== See also ==
- Communes of the Vaucluse department
