= Triumphal Arch of Orange =

UNESCO World Heritage Site commemorating veterans of Rome's Gallic Wars

UNESCO World Heritage Site
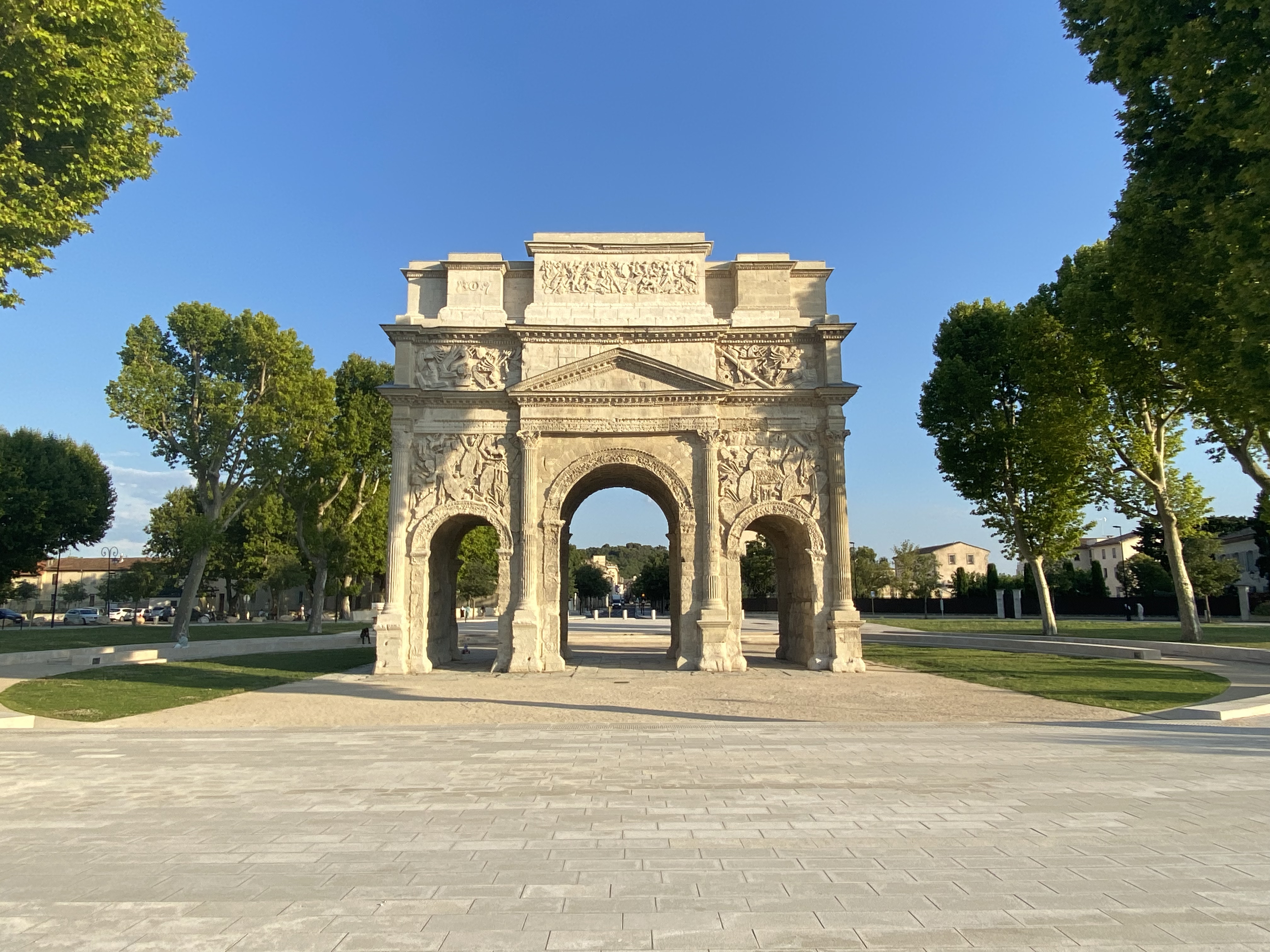
- Monumental Arch of Orange

- Location within Vaucluse Location within France
- Location: Orange, Vaucluse, France
- Part of: Roman Theatre and its Surroundings and the "Triumphal Arch" of Orange
- Criteria: Cultural: (iii), (iv)
- Reference: 163bis-002
- Inscription: 1981 (5th Session)
- Extensions: 2007
- Area: 0.01 ha (0.025 acres)
- Buffer zone: 116 ha (290 acres)
- Coordinates: 44°8′30.9″N 4°48′18.3″E

The Triumphal Arch of Orange (French: Arc de triomphe d'Orange; Occitan: Arca Triomfala d'Orange) is a triumphal arch located in the town of Orange, southeast France. There is debate about when the arch was built, but current research that accepts the inscription as evidence (27 BC–AD 14) favours a date during the reign of emperor Augustus. It was built on the former via Agrippa to honor the veterans of the Gallic Wars and Legio II Augusta. It was later reconstructed by emperor Tiberius to celebrate the victories of deceased general Germanicus over the German tribes in Rhineland (c. 20–27 AD). The arch contains an inscription dedicated to emperor Tiberius in AD 27. Along with the Roman Theatre of Orange, the Triumphal Arch was inscribed on the UNESCO World Heritage List in 1981 because of its exceptional preservation.

== Description ==
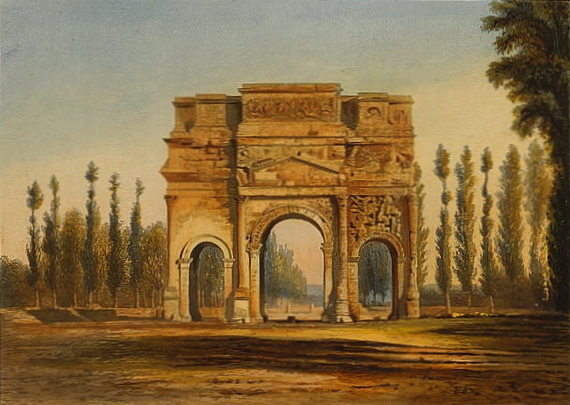
Triumphal Arc in 1842.

The arch was built into the town's walling during the Middle Ages to guard the northern entry points of the town. Architect Auguste Caristie studied the arch and carried out restoration work in the late 1820s. The arch was originally constructed using large unmortared limestone blocks. It has three arches, the center one being larger than the flanking ones. The entire structure measures 19.57 m (64.2 ft) long by 8.4 m (28 ft) wide, with a height of 19.21 m (63.0 ft). Each façade has four semi-engaged Corinthian columns. The arch is the oldest surviving example of a design that was used later in Rome itself, for the Arch of Septimius Severus and the Arch of Constantine. The visible pocks or holes are supposedly left by practicing medieval crossbowmen with little appreciation for art or history.

On the northern (outward-facing) facade, the architrave and cornice have been cut back and a bronze inscription inserted, now lost; attempts at reconstructing its text from the placement of cramp holes for the projecting tines of its letters have not been successful. The arch is decorated with various reliefs of military themes, including naval battles, spoils of war and Romans battling Germans and Gauls. A Roman foot soldier carrying the shield of Legio II Augusta is seen on the north front battle relief.

Details
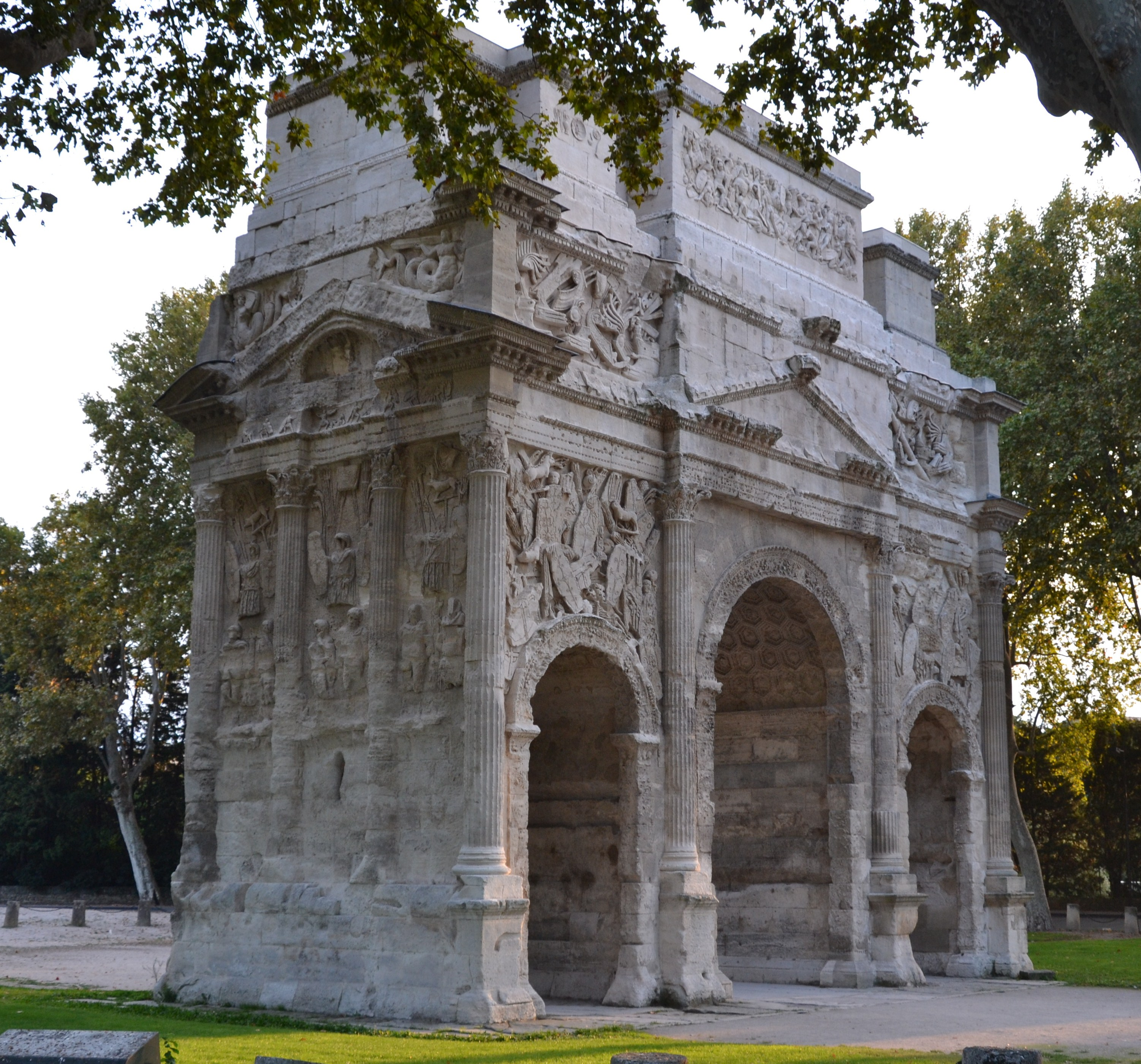
Front of Arch

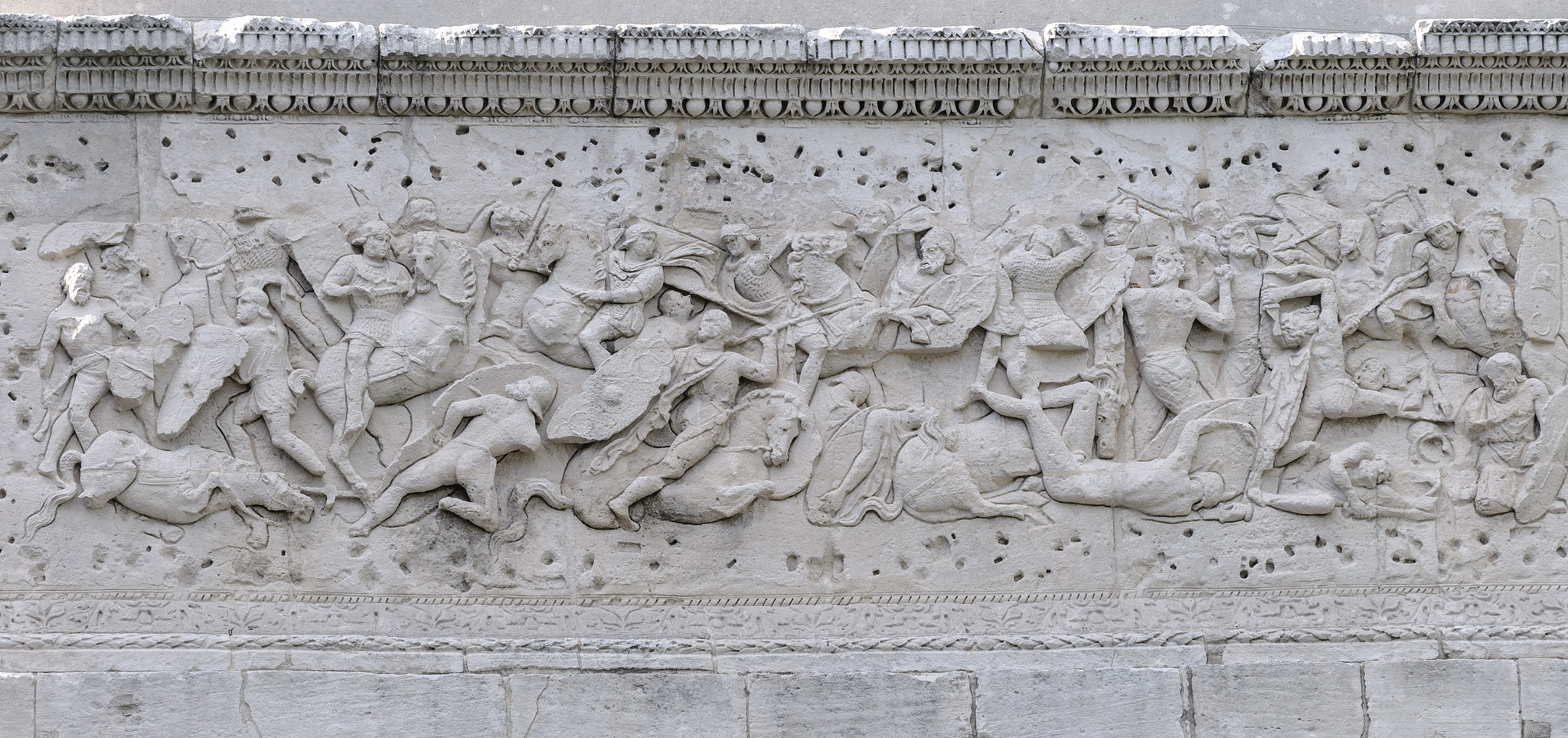
Top panel

== See also ==
- List of Roman triumphal arches
