= Roman Theatre of Orange =

Ancient Roman theater in Orange, France

UNESCO World Heritage Site
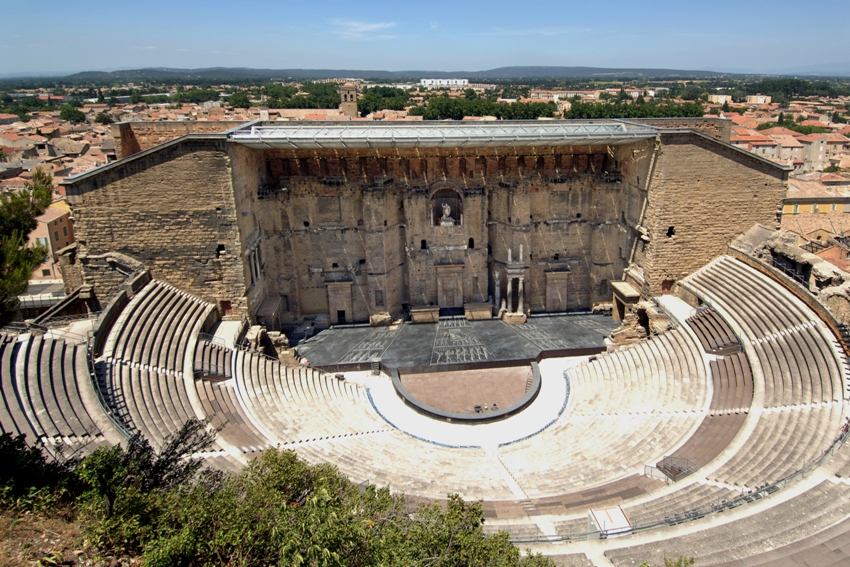

- Location within Vaucluse Location within France
- Location: Orange, Vaucluse, France
- Part of: Roman Theatre and its Surroundings and the "Triumphal Arch" of Orange
- Criteria: Cultural: (iii), (iv)
- Reference: 163bis-001
- Inscription: 1981 (5th Session)
- Extensions: 2007
- Area: 9.41 ha (23.3 acres)
- Buffer zone: 116 ha (290 acres)
- Website: www.culturespaces.com/en/orange
- Coordinates: 44°8′8.6″N 4°48′30.3″E

The Roman Theatre of Orange (French: Théâtre antique d'Orange) is a Roman theatre in Orange, Vaucluse, France. It was built early in the 1st century AD. The structure is owned by the municipality of Orange and is the home of the summer opera festival, the Chorégies d'Orange.

It is one of the best preserved of all Roman theatres, and served the Roman colony of Arausio (or, more specifically, Colonia Julia Firma Secundanorum Arausio: "the Julian colony of Arausio established by the soldiers of the second legion") which was founded in 40 BC. Playing a major role in the life of the citizens, who spent a large part of their free time there, the theatre was seen by the Roman authorities not only as a means of spreading Roman culture to the colonies, but also as a way of distracting them from all political activities.

Mime, pantomime, poetry readings and the "attelana" (a kind of farce rather like the commedia dell'arte) were the dominant forms of entertainment, much of which lasted all day. For the common people, who were fond of spectacular effects, magnificent stage sets became very important, as was the use of stage machinery. The entertainment offered was open to all and free of charge.

It has been restored to its former function, primarily for opera, alongside its use as a tourist spot. In 1981, the Roman Theatre was inscribed on the UNESCO World Heritage List for its outstanding preservation and architecture.

== Construction and structure ==
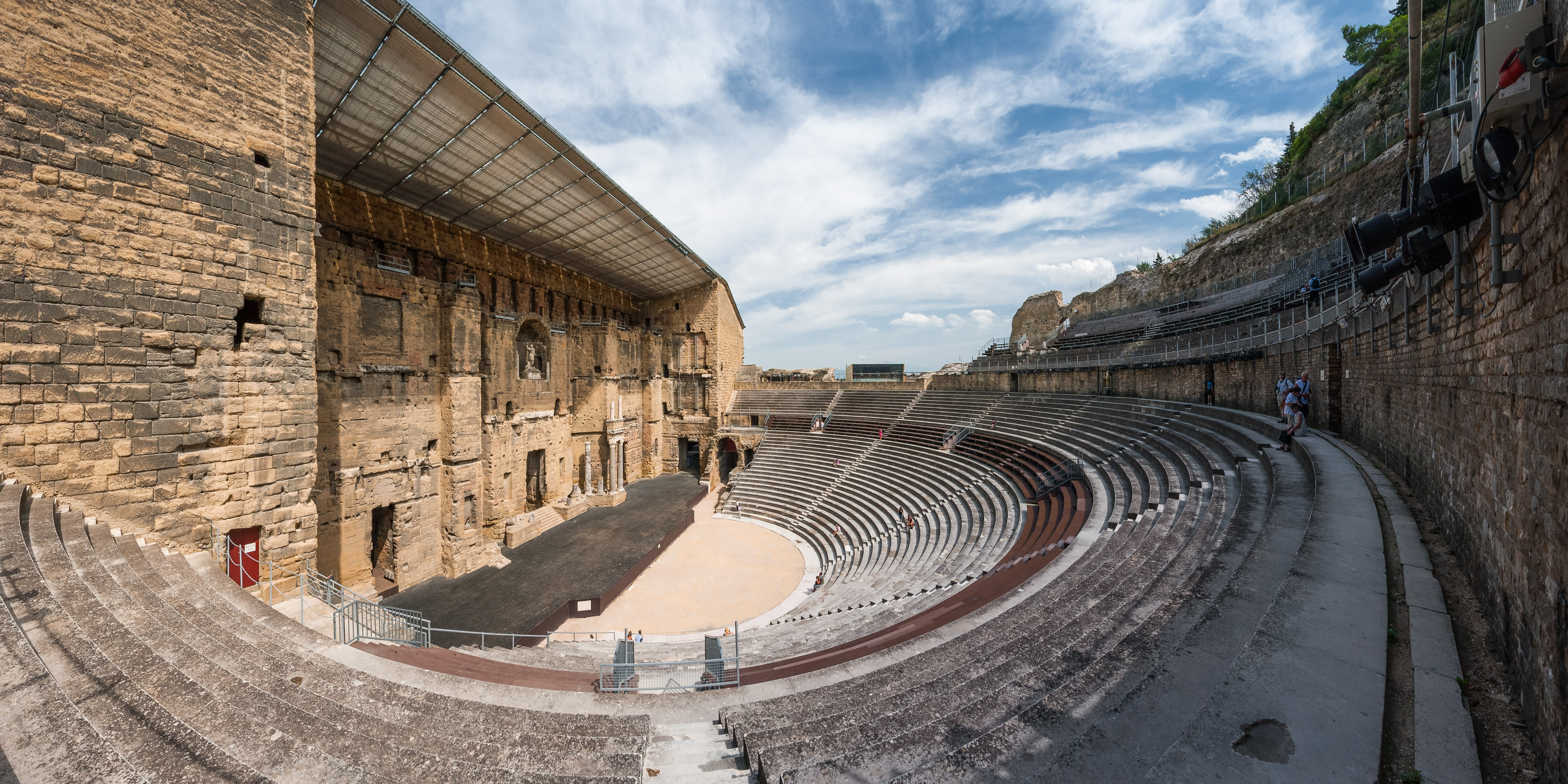
The Orange theatre is one of few Roman theatres which still retains the Scaenae frons, at the rear of the stage, though stripped of its elaborate decoration.

Early Roman theatres were mostly constructed from wood and meant to be temporary structures. In 55 BC Pompey had a stone theatre built in his home city of Rome, and thereafter grand (and permanent) Roman theatres spread widely. The Orange theatre was created under the rule of Augustus, and is believed to be one of the first of its kind in this area of modern-day France. One of the most iconic parts of this structure is the grand exterior facade, which measures 103 meters (338 ft) long and 37 meters (121 ft) high. Originally, there was a wooden roof across the theatre to protect the audience from unfavorable weather conditions. There is evidence on the walls that shows that, at some point, the roof was destroyed in a fire. Although it is relatively sparse in decoration and embellishment, the three-story wall gives an overwhelmingly powerful appearance to the entire building. The main three doors on the first level of the facade open directly onto the stage inside the theatre, which can seat from 5,800 up to 7,300 (much of the seating has been reconstructed to ensure the safety of tourists and audience members).

The stage, which is 61 meters (200 ft) long and raised about one meter from the ground, is backed by a 37-meter-high (121 ft) wall whose height has been preserved completely. This wall is vital to the theatre, as it helped to project sound to the large audience. The wall, also known as the scaenae frons, is the only architecturally decorated surface throughout the entire theatre. It originally was embellished with marble mosaics of many different colors, multiple columns and friezes, and statues placed in niches. The central niche contains a 3.5-meter-high (11 ft) statue of the emperor Augustus, although this was most likely a restoration of an original statue of Apollo, the god of music and the arts. The central door, below the niche containing this statue, is called the Royal Door, or valva regia. This door was used only by the most important, principal actors to enter and exit the stage. Above the door was a frieze decorated with centaurs, which is no longer there but is instead on display across the street in the Orange Museum (only remains are left). The stage was covered with a modern platform when the theatre began to be used again for operas and other performances.

== Decay ==
As the Western Roman Empire declined during the 4th century, by which time Christianity had become the official religion, the theatre was closed by official edict in AD 391, since the Church opposed what it regarded at the time as uncivilized spectacles. It was probably pillaged by the Visigoths in 412, and like most Roman buildings was certainly stripped of its better stone over the centuries for reuse. It was used as a defensive post in the early Middle Ages, and by the 12th century began to be used by the Church for religious plays. During the 16th-century religious wars, it became a refuge for the townspeople when the town was sacked during The French Wars of Religion. Much of the population left.

== Reconstruction ==
Reconstruction began in 1825 with the intent of returning the theatre to its original purpose: to host large, exciting performances. In 1869, while still in the process of being restored, the theatre hosted “The Roman Festivals,” which brought over 10,000 guests. A very important part of the restoration was excavating the area around the theatre, which occurred in the 1930s. This excavation and leveling of surrounding buildings uncovered many historical objects and artifacts that furthered knowledge of the history and uses of the structure. Today, all three levels of seating have been completely restored, along with many staircases, major parts of the pavement, the stage, the orchestra, and parts of walls.

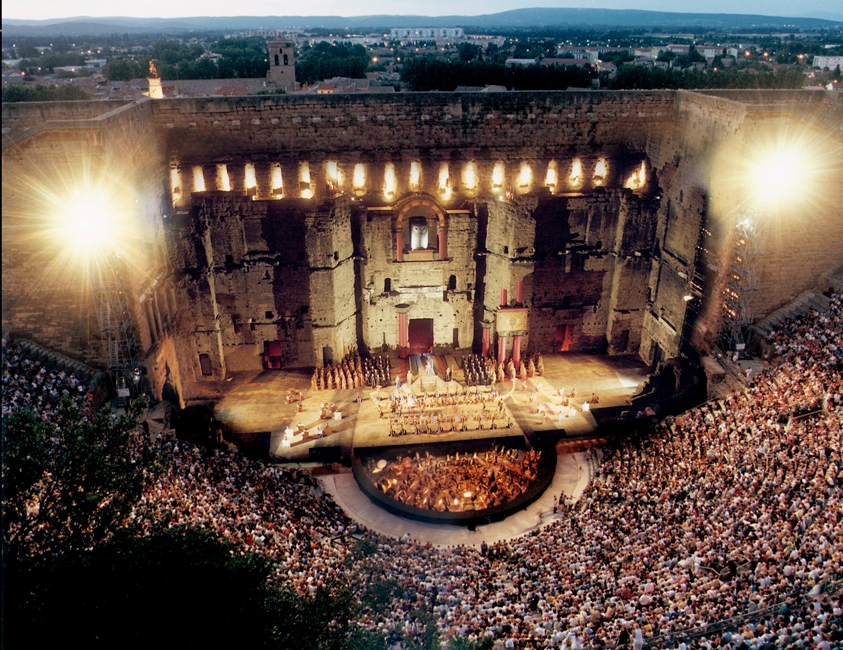
A performance at the 2007 Chorégies festival

During the 19th century the theatre slowly began to recover its original splendour, due to the efforts of Prosper Mérimée, who then held the position of director of "Monuments Historiques." Under his direction, restoration work began in 1825 and in 1869 the theatre became the home of a "Roman Festival" which celebrated the glory of Rome and included a performance of Méhul's opera, Joseph. In the latter part of the century, all the major players of the French classical stage appeared in the Orange festivals, including Sarah Bernhardt who played "Phèdre" in 1903.

By the end of the century, the tiered seats were restored, a reflection of the bureaucratic process. In 1902 the festival was given a new name, the "Chorégies," planned as an annual summer festival. The name comes from the tax that was imposed on wealthy Romans to pay for theatrical productions. Until 1969 the Chorégies consisted of plays, alternating with musical works, opera and symphonies. However, after that date, Orange became solely an opera festival and theatrical works were performed at Avignon.

== Current use ==
The Théâtre d'Orange is considered the best preserved Roman theatre in all of Europe. It is managed by Culturespaces, an organization that also manages other related cultural sites in the area, such as the Orange Museum and the Triumphal Arch, among other sites in the South of France. This effort of preservation allows it to be used not just as a historical site but also as a venue for concerts and theatrical performances.

The first major festival held in the theatre in 1869 after the restoration began was called “The Roman Festival”. This festival developed into an annual festival called the Chorégies (see below). These multimedia events attract thousands of visitors from around the world.

During the rest of the year, the Théâtre d'Orange is a major tourist attraction. Tourists can walk through the main theatre and surrounding rooms and corridors while being led by an audio guide.

In 1981 UNESCO declared the theatre as a World Heritage Site.

== Gallery ==
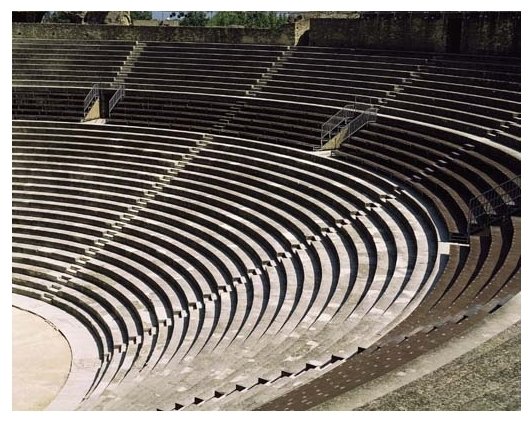
Seating in the theatre

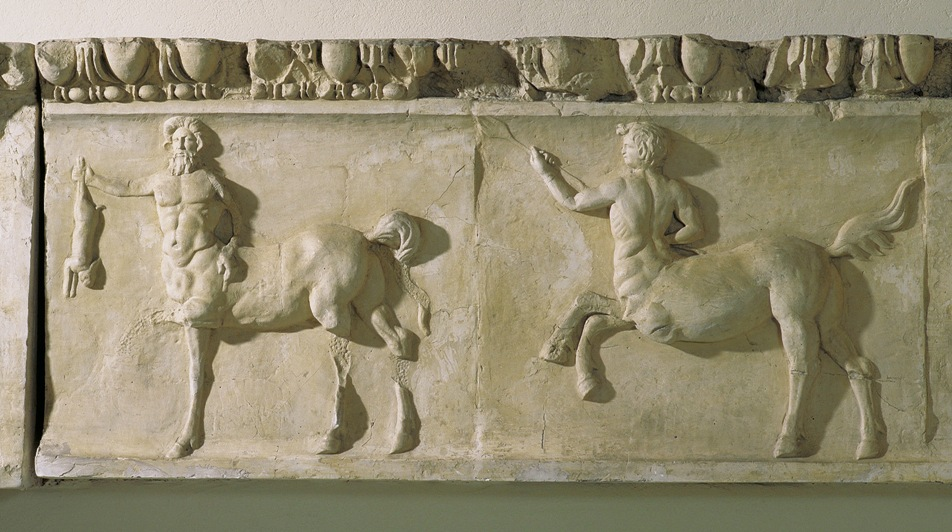
The centaur frieze

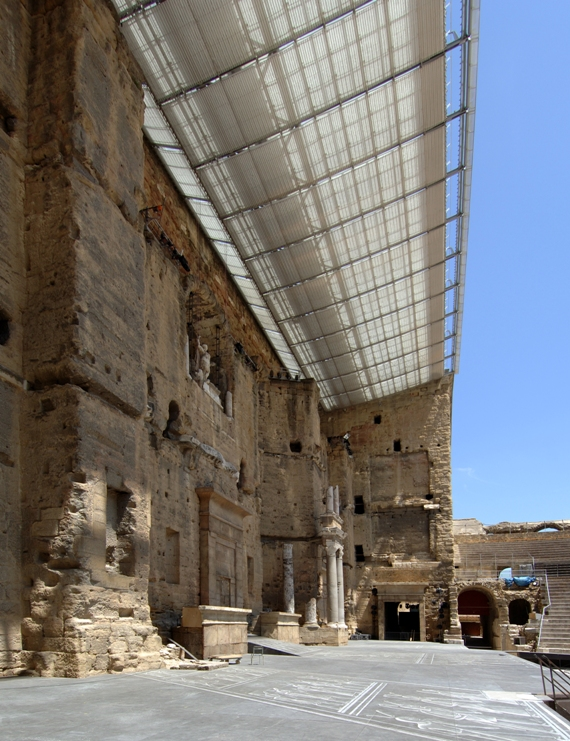
The new stage roof

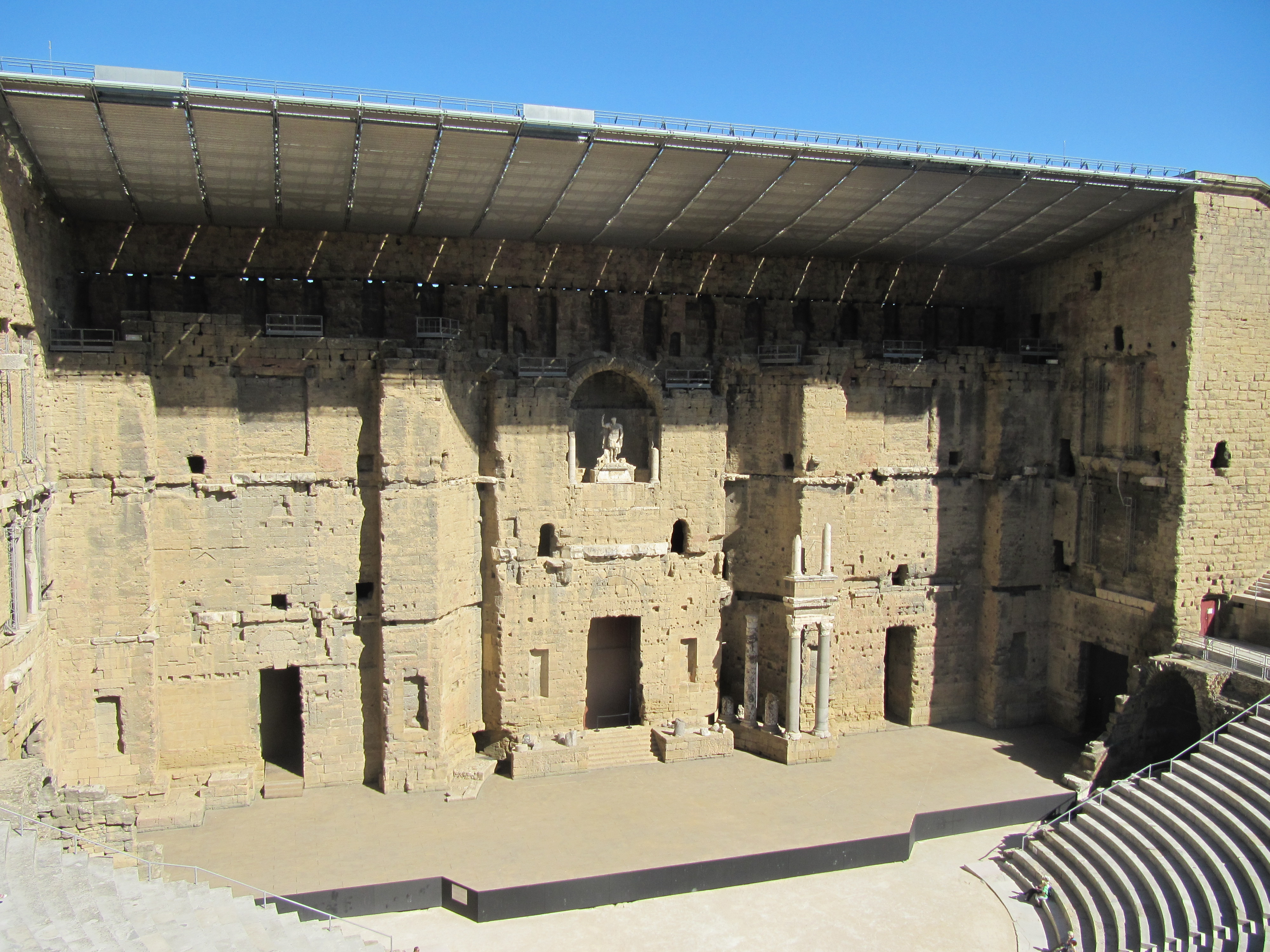
Roman Theatre with new stage roof

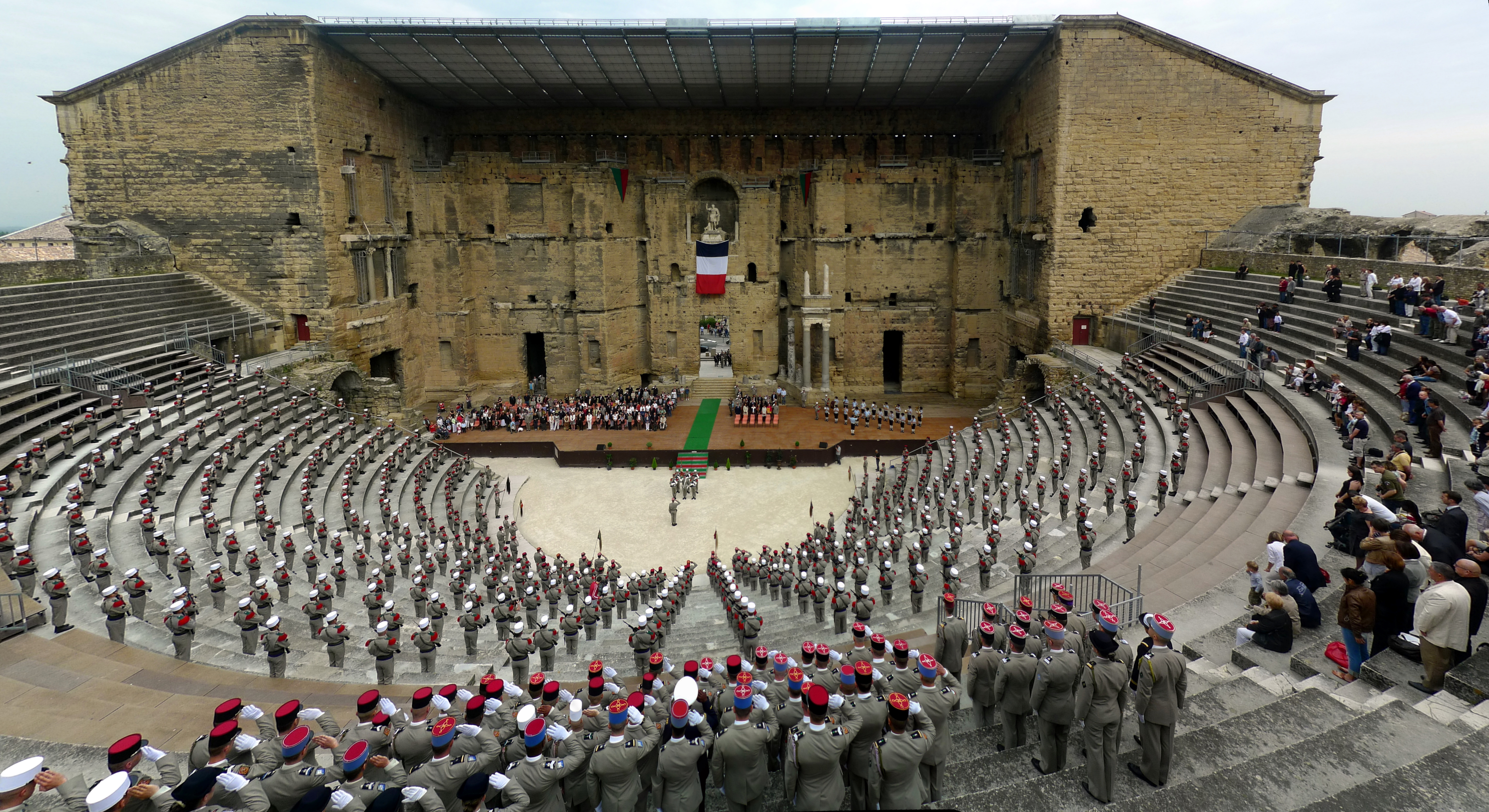
The French Foreign Legion celebrating Camerone Day in the Roman Theatre of Orange

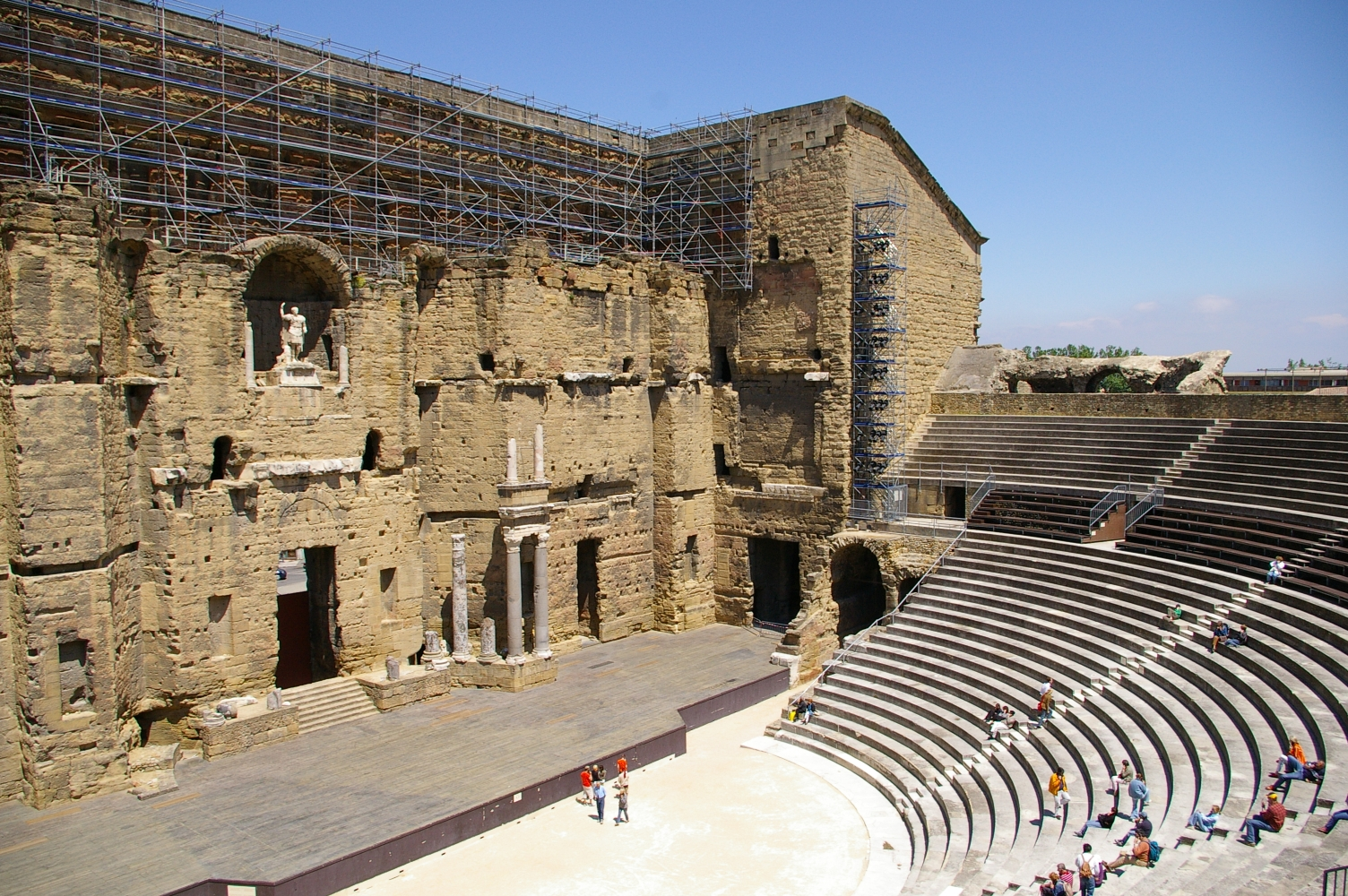
Seating and stage, with roof under restoration, 2005

== See also ==
- List of Roman theatres
- List of opera festivals
