= Orange, Vaucluse =

Orange Aurenja (Occitan)
- Commune
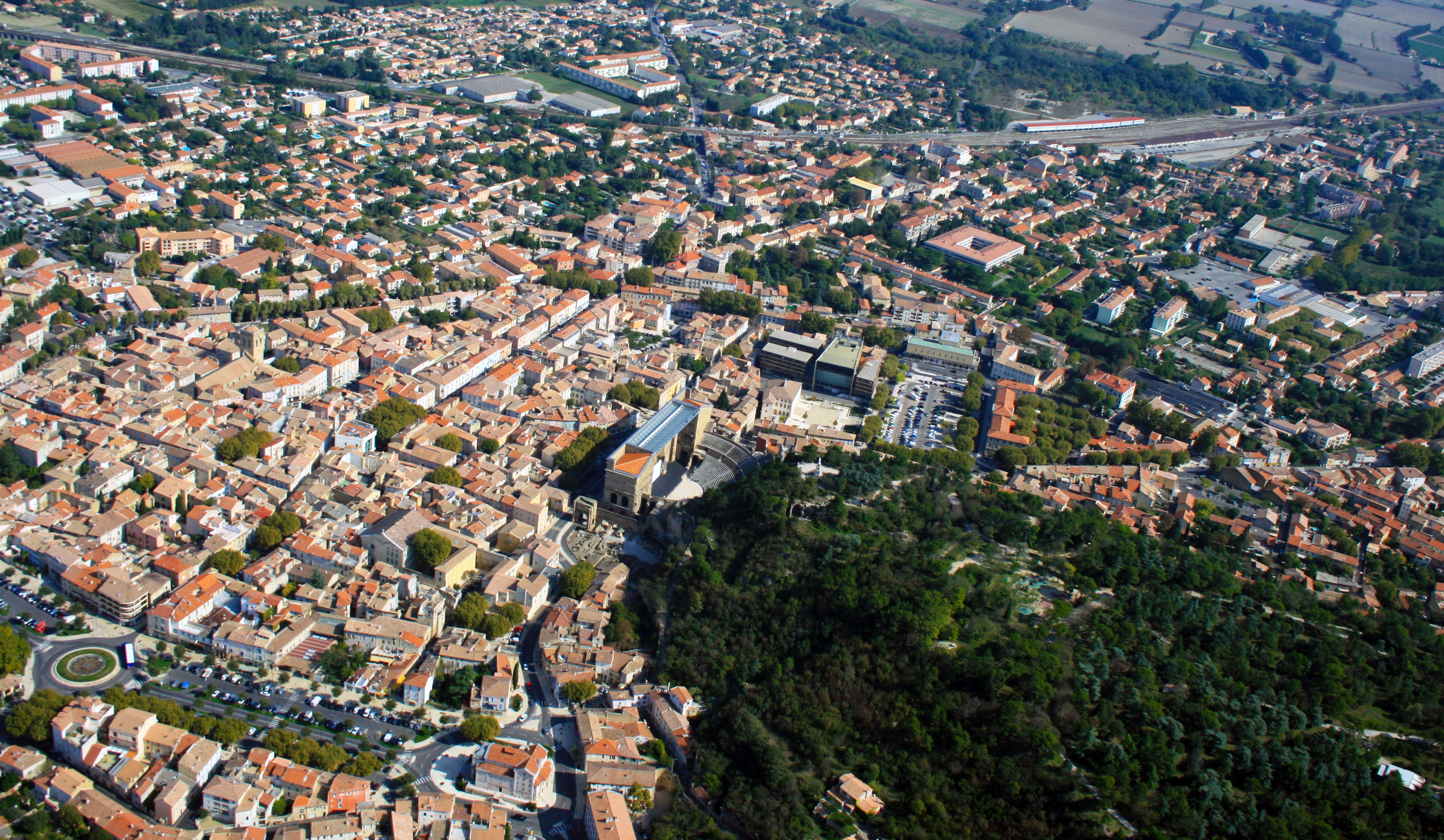
- Aerial view of central Orange

- Coat of arms
- Location of Orange
- Location within France Location within Provence-Alpes-Côte d'Azur
- Coordinates: 44°08′18″N 4°48′35″E
- Country: France
- Region: Provence-Alpes-Côte d'Azur
- Department: Vaucluse
- Arrondissement: Carpentras
- Canton: Orange
- Intercommunality: CC Pays d'Orange en Provence

Government
  - Mayor (2021–2026): Yann Bompard (LS)
- Area^{1}: 74.2 km^{2} (28.6 sq mi)
- Elevation: 50 m (160 ft)
- Highest elevation: 127 m (417 ft)
- Lowest elevation: 24 m (79 ft)
- Population (2023): 29,706
  - Density: 400/km^{2} (1,040/sq mi)
- Time zone: UTC+01:00 (CET)
  - Summer (DST): UTC+02:00 (CEST)
- INSEE/Postal code: 84087 /84100
- ^{1} French Land Register data, which excludes lakes, ponds, glaciers > 1 km^{2} (0.386 sq mi or 247 acres) and river estuaries.

Roman Theatre and its surroundings and the Triumphal Arch of Orange
UNESCO World Heritage Site
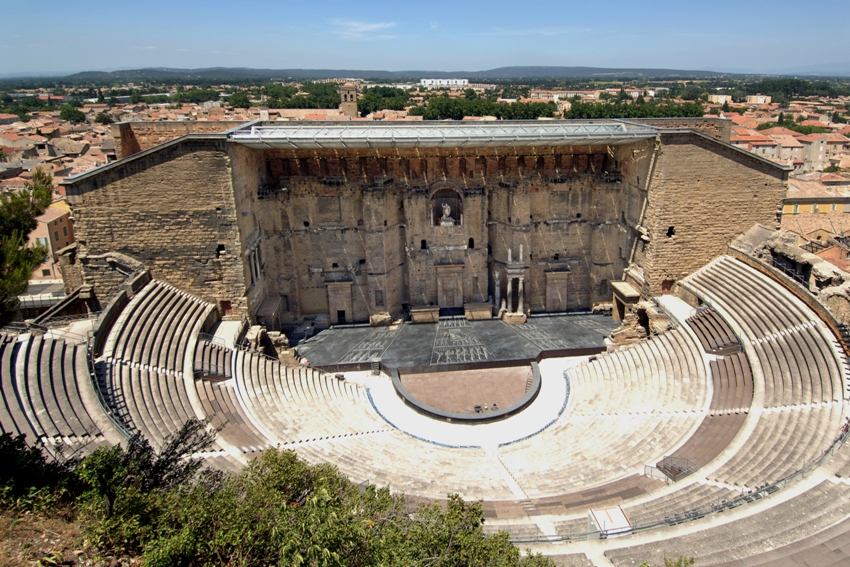
- Interactive map of Roman Theatre and its surroundings and the Triumphal Arch of Orange
- Includes: Roman Theatre of Orange and Triumphal Arch of Orange
- Criteria: Cultural: iii, vi
- Reference: 163
- Inscription: 1981 (5th Session)

Orange (French pronunciation: [ɔʁɑ̃ʒ]; Provençal: Aurenja (classical norm) or Aurenjo (Mistralian norm)) is a commune in the Vaucluse department in the Provence-Alpes-Côte d'Azur region in Southeastern France. It is about 21 km (13 mi) north of Avignon, on the departmental border with Gard, which follows the Rhône and also constitutes the regional border with Occitania. Orange is the second-most populated city in Vaucluse, after Avignon.

== Name ==
The name itself derived from an earlier Proto-Celtic *far-aws(y)o-, which literally means 'in front of the ear' (cf. Old Irish ara, arae; Ancient Greek pareiaí, parauai < *par-ausiā). This became the Gaulish ar-aus(i)o- ('temple, cheek'). It is cognate with the name of other ancient settlements, including Arausa, Arausia, Arausona (Dalmatia) and the nearby Oraison (Alpes-de-Haute-Provence).

The settlement is attested in Latin as Arausio in the first century CE, as Arausion in the second century, as civitas Arausione in the fourth century, as civitas Arausicae in 517 (via a Germanized form *Arausinga), as Aurengia civitatis in 1136, and, finally, as Orenga in 1205.

The name was originally unrelated to that of the orange fruit, but was later conflated with it during the Middle Ages.

== History ==
A Celtic settlement called Aurasio existed in the same place, named after a local sacred spring. A major battle was fought there in 105 BC between two Roman armies and the Cimbri and Teutones tribes.

In 35 BC, after Julius Caesar conquered Gaul, veterans of the second legion established a Roman city on the site, also named Arausio, or Colonia Julia Firma Secundanorum Arausio in full, "the Julian colony of Arausio established by the soldiers of the second legion."

Roman Arausio covered an area of some 70 ha (170 acres) and was well-endowed with civic monuments; in addition to the theatre and arch, it had a monumental temple complex and a forum.

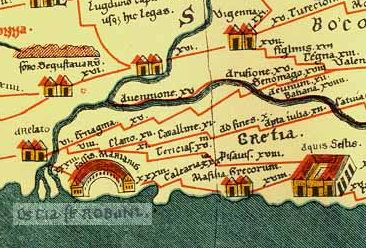
Orange in the Table Peutinger

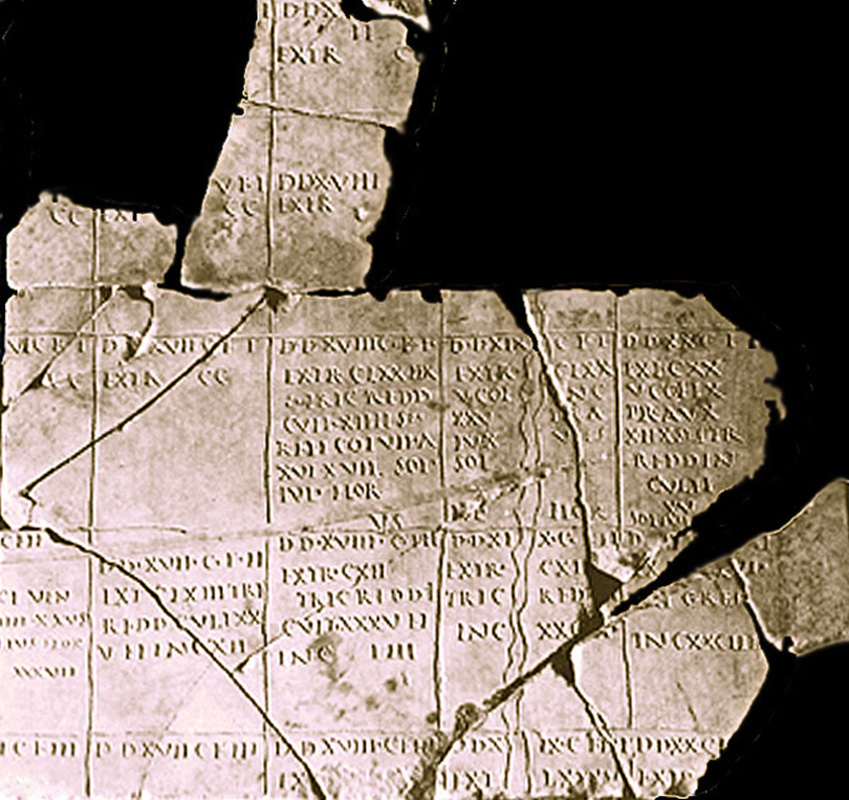
Roman cadaster of Orange

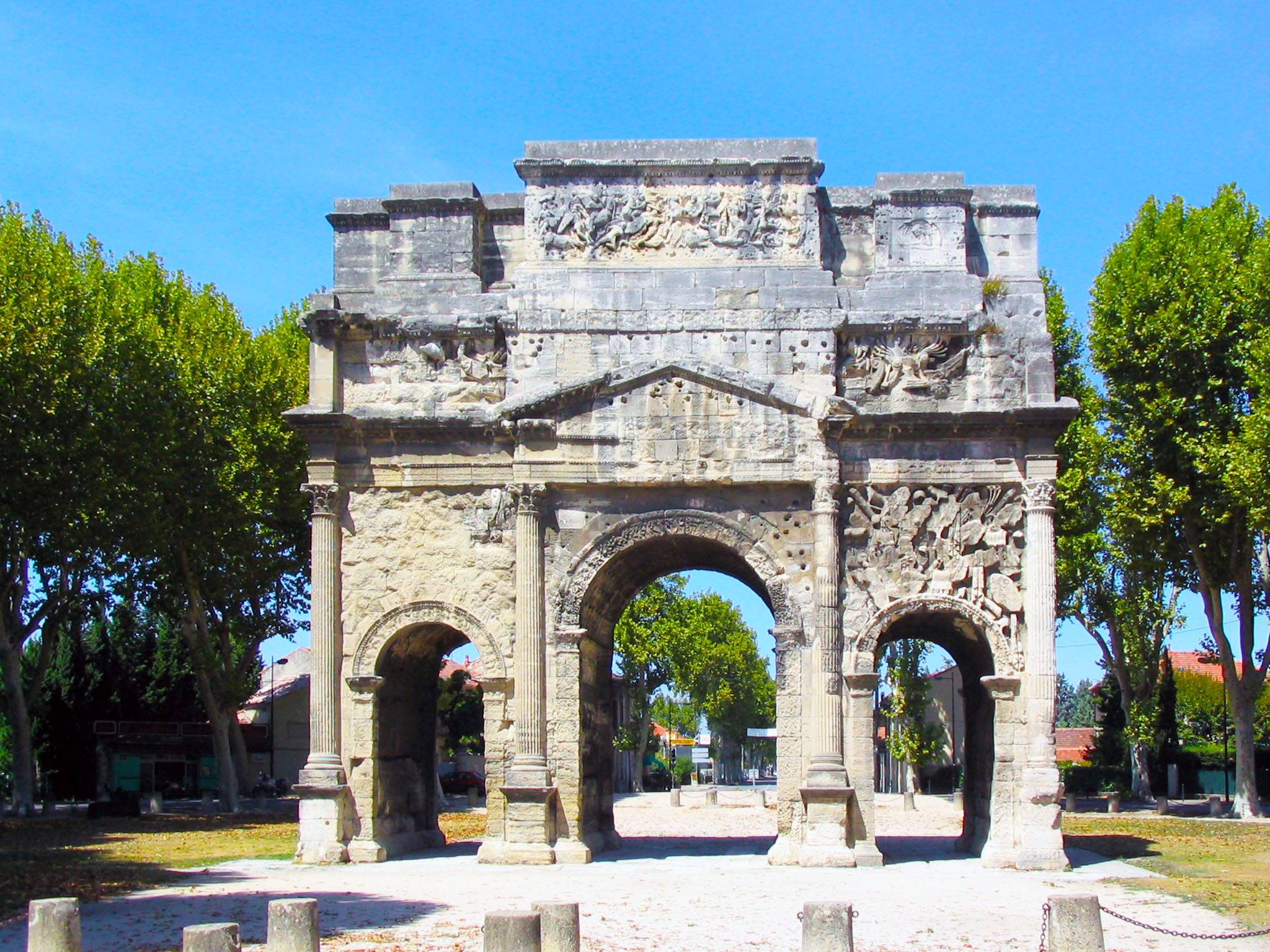
The Triumphal Arch of Orange

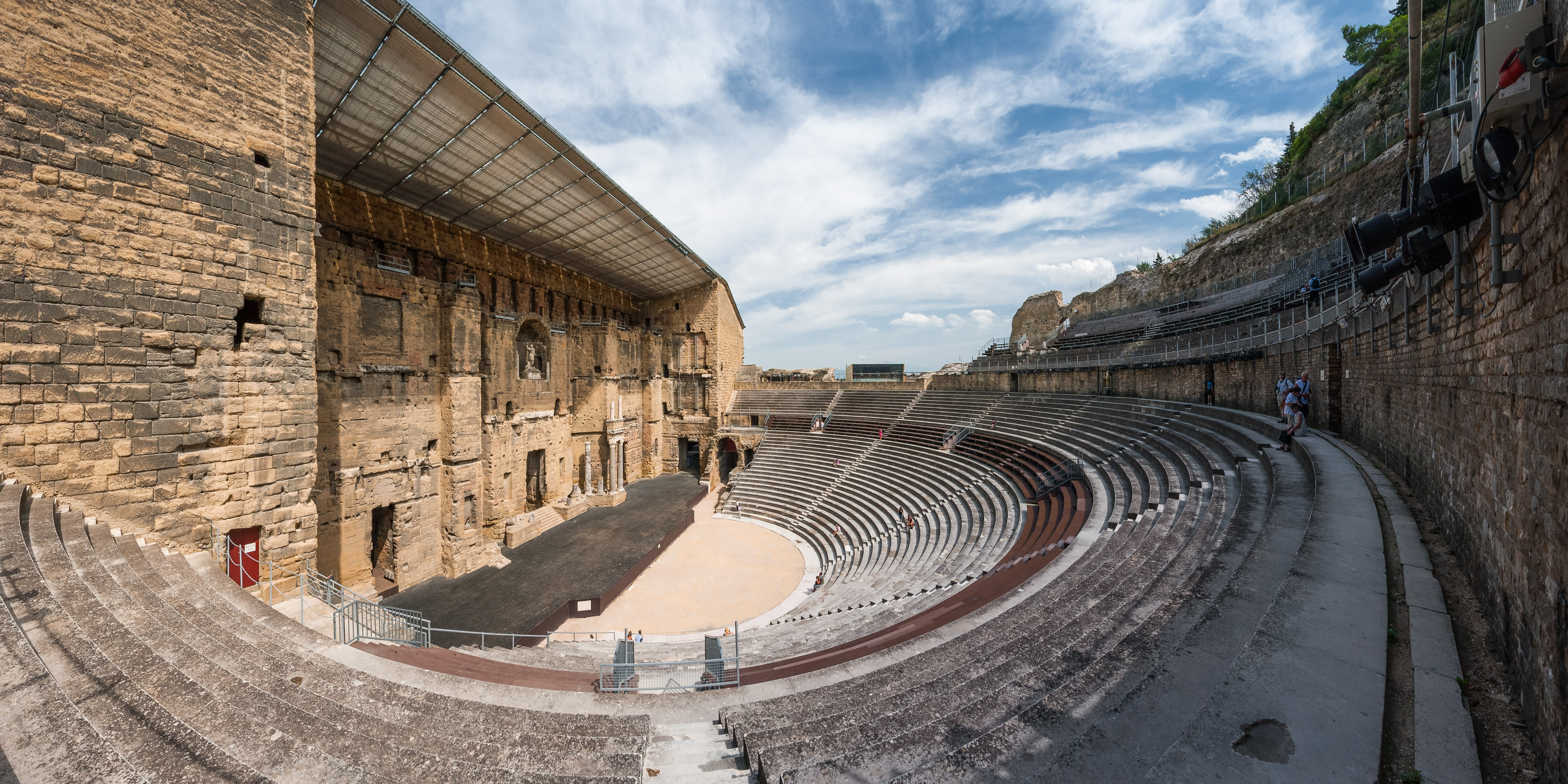
The Roman Theatre in Orange

It was the capital of a wide area of northern Provence, which was parcelled up into lots for the Roman colonists. "Orange of two thousand years ago was a miniature Rome, complete with many of the public buildings that would have been familiar to a citizen of the Roman Empire, except that the scale of the buildings had been reduced – a smaller theater to accommodate a smaller population, for example." It is found in both the Tabula Peutingeriana and Le cadastre d'Orange maps.

The town prospered, but was sacked by the Visigoths in 412. It had, by then, become largely Christianised, and from the end of the third century constituted the Ancient Diocese of Orange. No longer a residential bishopric, Arausio, as it is called in Latin, is today listed by the Catholic Church as a titular see. It hosted two important synods, in 441 and 529. The Second Council of Orange was of importance in condemning what later came to be called Semipelagianism.

The sovereign Carolingian counts of Orange had their origin in the eighth century; they passed into the family of the lords of Baux. From the 12th century, Orange was raised to a minor principality, the Principality of Orange, as a fief of the Holy Roman Empire. During this period, the town and the principality of Orange belonged to the administration and province of Dauphiné.

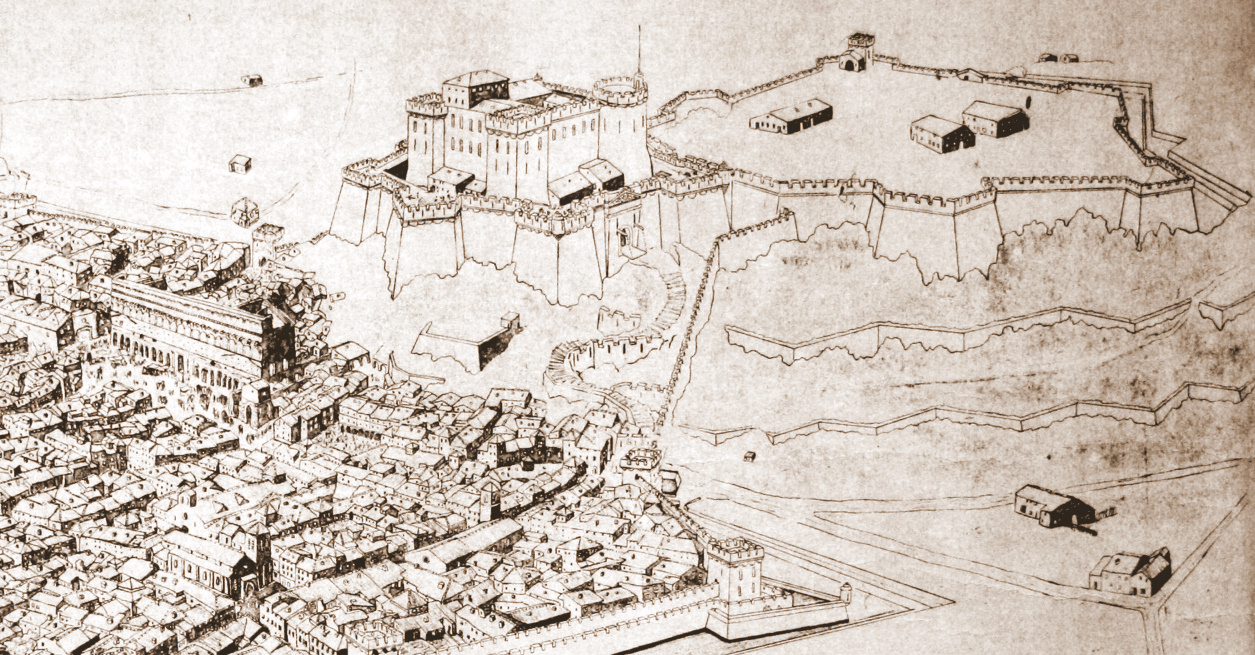
Artist's impression of 17th century city and its citadel, by G. Trouillet.

When William the Silent, count of Nassau, with estates in the Netherlands, inherited the title Prince of Orange in 1544, the principality was incorporated into the holdings of what became the House of Orange-Nassau. This pitched it into the Protestant side in the Wars of Religion, during which the town was badly damaged. In 1568, the Eighty Years' War began with William as stadtholder leading the bid for independence from Spain. William the Silent was assassinated in Delft in 1584. His son, Maurice of Nassau (Prince of Orange after his elder brother died in 1618), with the help of Johan van Oldenbarnevelt, solidified the independence of the Dutch republic. The United Provinces survived to become the Netherlands, which is still ruled by the House of Orange-Nassau. William, Prince of Orange, great grandson of William the Silent, ruled England as William III. Orange gave its name to other Dutch-influenced parts of the world, such as the Oranges (West Orange, South Orange, East Orange, Orange) in New Jersey and the Orange Free State in South Africa. The Hôtel de Ville is a former private residence which was completed in 1671.

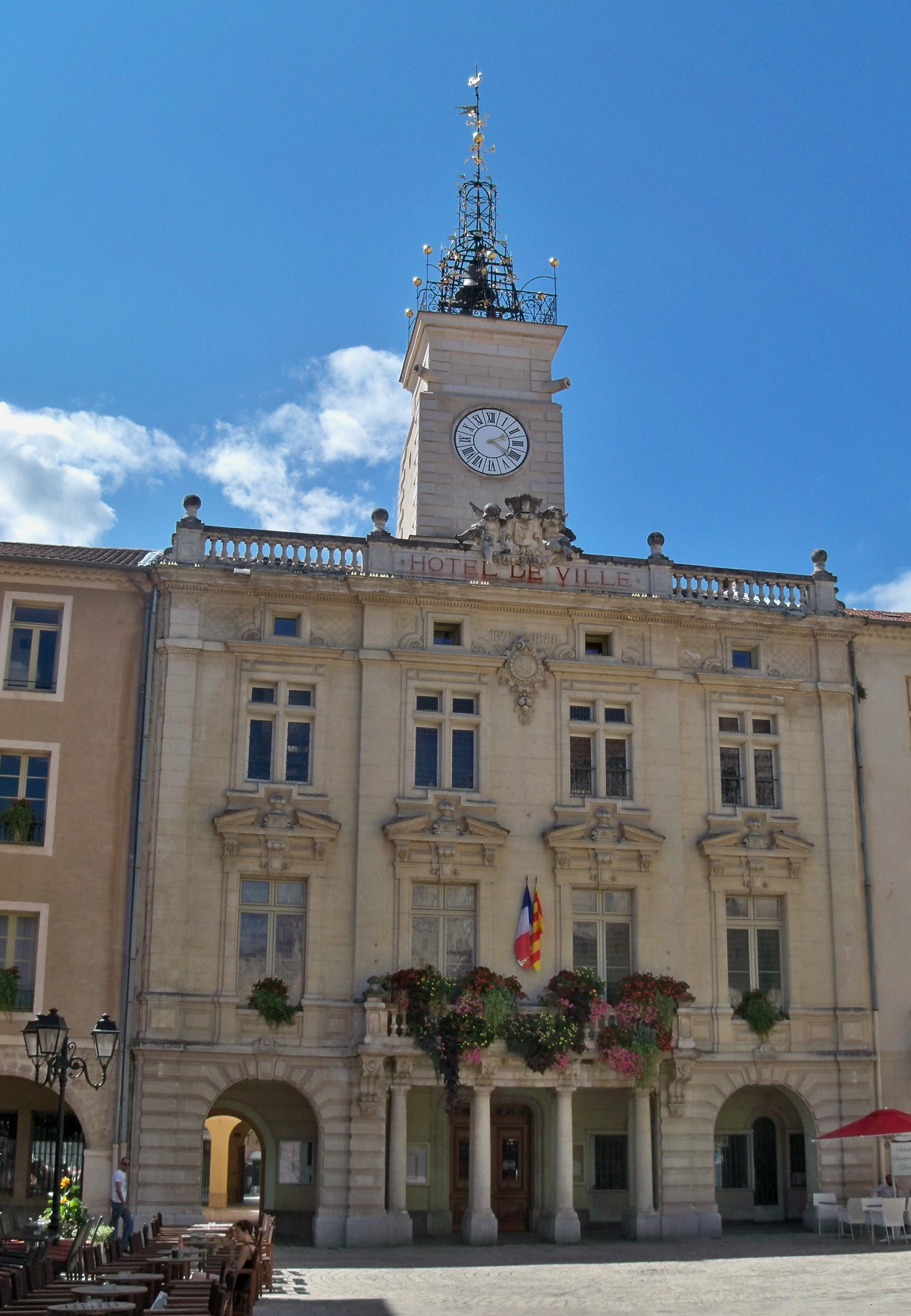
The Hôtel de Ville

The city remained part of scattered Nassau holdings until it was repeatedly captured by the forces of Louis XIV during his wars of the late 17th century. The city was occupied by France in 1673, 1679, 1690, 1697 and 1702–1713 before it was finally ceded to France in 1713 under the Treaty of Utrecht.

Following the French Revolution in 1789, Orange was absorbed into the French department of Drôme, then Bouches-du-Rhône, then finally Vaucluse. However, the title remained with the Dutch princes of Orange.

Orange attracted international attention in 1995, when it elected a member of the National Front (FN), Jacques Bompard, as its mayor. Bompard left the FN in 2005 and became a member of the conservative Movement for France (MPF) until 2010, when he founded the League of the South (LS).

Orange was home to the French Foreign Legion's armored First Foreign Cavalry Regiment until 11 July 2014, when the regiment officially moved to the Camp de Carpiagne in the 9th arrondissement of Marseille in the Massif des Calanques. On 1 January 2017, together with a number of neighbouring communes, it was transferred from the arrondissement of Avignon to the arrondissement of Carpentras.

== Demographics ==
With 29,706 residents (as of 2023), Orange is the third-largest commune of Vaucluse by population, after Avignon and Carpentras.

Historical population

Year	Pop.	±% p.a.
1793	7,000	—
1800	7,270	+0.54%
1806	7,440	+0.39%
1821	8,307	+0.74%
1831	9,123	+0.94%
1836	8,874	−0.55%
1841	8,633	−0.55%
1846	9,231	+1.35%
1851	9,824	+1.25%
1856	10,621	+1.57%
1861	10,007	−1.18%
1866	10,622	+1.20%
1872	10,064	−0.90%
1876	10,212	+0.37%
1881	10,301	+0.17%
1886	10,280	−0.04%
1891	9,859	−0.83%
1896	9,980	+0.24%
1901	10,096	+0.23%

Year	Pop.	±% p.a.
1906	10,303	+0.41%
1911	11,087	+1.48%
1921	10,766	−0.29%
1926	10,799	+0.06%
1931	11,956	+2.06%
1936	12,946	+1.60%
1946	13,978	+0.77%
1954	17,478	+2.83%
1962	19,912	+1.64%
1968	24,562	+3.56%
1975	25,371	+0.46%
1982	26,499	+0.62%
1990	26,964	+0.22%
1999	27,989	+0.42%
2007	30,025	+0.88%
2012	28,948	−0.73%
2017	28,919	−0.02%
2023	29,706	+0.45%

Source: EHESS and INSEE (1968-2023)

== Main sights ==
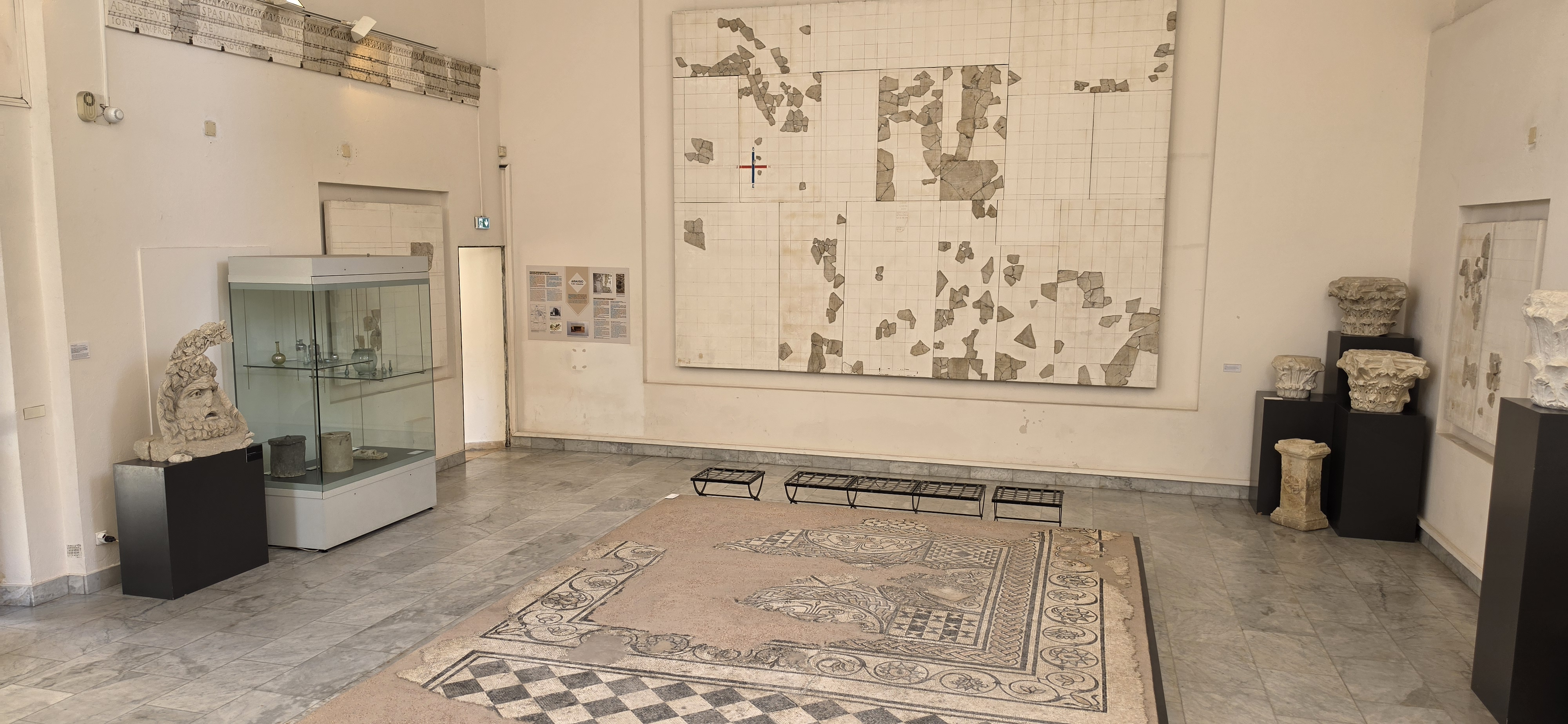
The Orange museum, with the unique Roman cadastre on the wall.

The town is renowned for its Roman architecture; its Roman theatre is described as the most impressive still existing in Europe. The Triumphal Arch is of uncertain age, but current research accepts the inscription as evidence of a date during the reign of emperor Augustus. The arch also contains an inscription dedicated to emperor Tiberius in AD 27, when it was reconstructed to celebrate the victories of Germanicus over the German tribes in the Rhineland. The arch, theatre, and surroundings were listed in 1981 by UNESCO as a World Heritage Site.

The Musée (Museum) displays the biggest (7.56 x 5.90 m) cadastral Roman maps ever recovered, etched on marble. They cover the area between Orange, Nîmes, and Montélimar.

== Culture ==
In 1869, the Roman theatre was restored and has been the site of a music festival. The festival, given the name Chorégies d'Orange in 1902, has been held annually ever since, and is now famous as an international opera festival.

In 1971, the "New Chorégies" were started and became an overnight, international success. Many top international opera singers have performed in the theatre, such as Barbara Hendricks, Plácido Domingo, Montserrat Caballé, Roberto Alagna, René Pape and Inva Mula. Operas such as Tosca, Aida, Faust, and Carmine Karm Conte have been staged here.

The Roman theatre is one of three heritage sites at which the Roman wall remains.

== Transportation ==
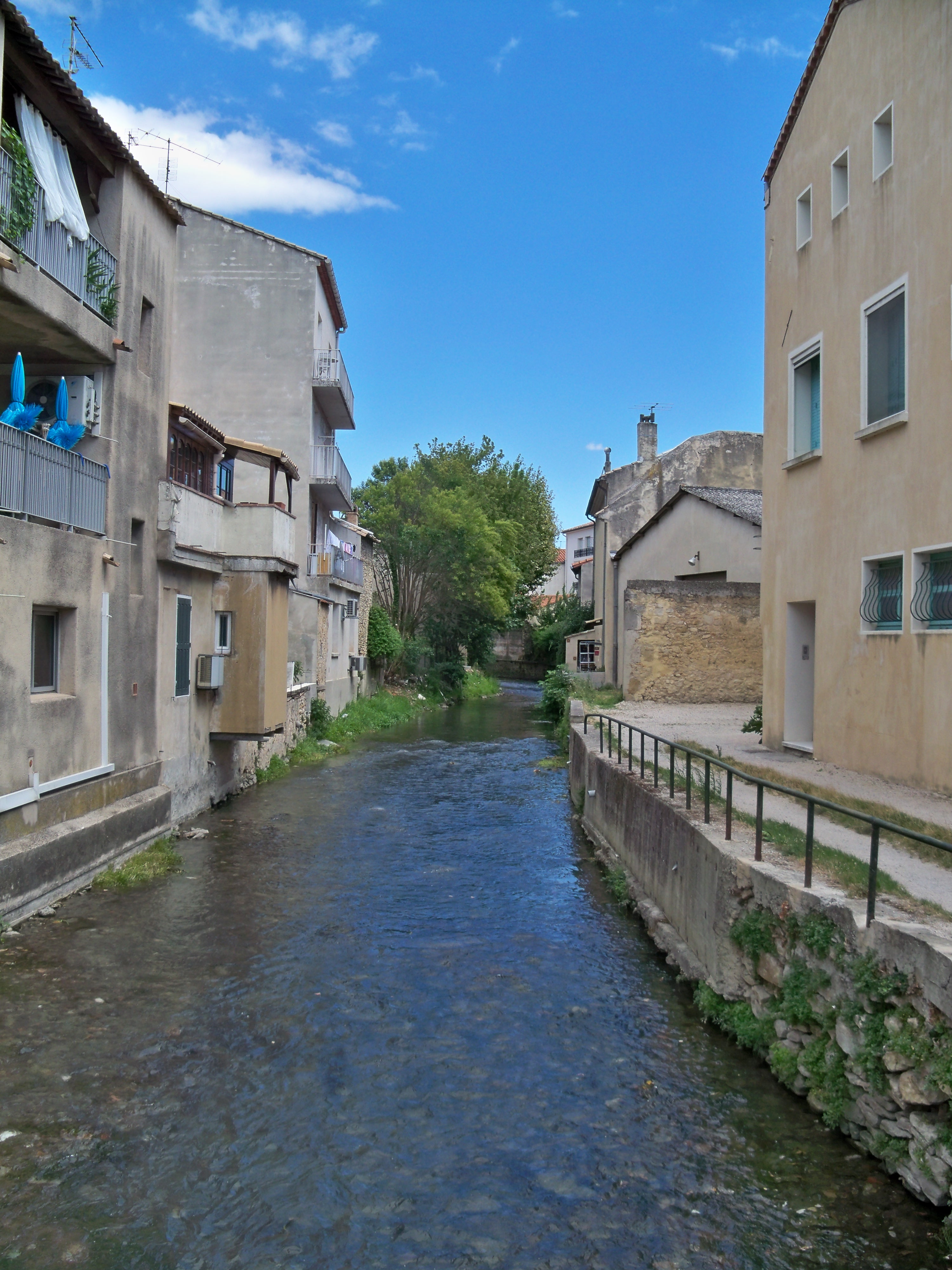
The Meyne River

The SNCF offers rail service north to Lyon and Paris, as well as south to Avignon and Marseille.

== Twin towns – sister cities ==
Orange is twinned with:

- Breda, Netherlands (1963)
- Byblos, Lebanon (2004)
- Diest, Belgium (1963)
- Dillenburg, Germany (1963)
- Jarosław, Poland (2000)
- Kielce, Poland (1992)
- Rastatt, Germany (1965)
- Spoleto, Italy (1981)
- Vélez-Rubio, Spain (2004)
- Weifang, China (2004)

Orange forms the Union of Orange Cities together with Breda, Diest and Dillenburg.

== Notable people ==
- Maëlle Lakrar (born 2000), footballer for the France national team

== Climate ==
Orange features a humid subtropical climate (Cfa), with just too much rainfall in summer to have a 'Mediterranean' (Csa) classification. Summers are hot and relatively dry. Most rainfall occurs in spring and autumn, though with gentle temperatures. Winters are mild, but harsh frost and snow are not unheard of. On 28 June 2019 the temperature reached 41.0 °C.

Climate data for Orange, Vaucluse (1991–2020 normals, extremes 1952–present)
Month	Jan	Feb	Mar	Apr	May	Jun	Jul	Aug	Sep	Oct	Nov	Dec	Year
Record high °C (°F)	20.5 (68.9)	23.9 (75.0)	27.2 (81.0)	31.2 (88.2)	34.5 (94.1)	41.2 (106.2)	40.7 (105.3)	42.7 (108.9)	35.8 (96.4)	31.8 (89.2)	24.6 (76.3)	20.2 (68.4)	42.7 (108.9)
Mean daily maximum °C (°F)	10.3 (50.5)	11.9 (53.4)	16.2 (61.2)	19.3 (66.7)	23.6 (74.5)	28.1 (82.6)	31.1 (88.0)	30.8 (87.4)	25.5 (77.9)	20.3 (68.5)	14.2 (57.6)	10.6 (51.1)	20.2 (68.4)
Daily mean °C (°F)	6.2 (43.2)	7.2 (45.0)	10.8 (51.4)	13.6 (56.5)	17.7 (63.9)	21.9 (71.4)	24.5 (76.1)	24.2 (75.6)	19.7 (67.5)	15.4 (59.7)	10.1 (50.2)	6.7 (44.1)	14.8 (58.6)
Mean daily minimum °C (°F)	2.1 (35.8)	2.4 (36.3)	5.3 (41.5)	7.9 (46.2)	11.9 (53.4)	15.6 (60.1)	18.0 (64.4)	17.7 (63.9)	14.0 (57.2)	10.6 (51.1)	6.0 (42.8)	2.8 (37.0)	9.5 (49.1)
Record low °C (°F)	−13.4 (7.9)	−14.5 (5.9)	−9.7 (14.5)	−3.2 (26.2)	1.3 (34.3)	5.7 (42.3)	9.5 (49.1)	8.3 (46.9)	3.1 (37.6)	−1.6 (29.1)	−5.8 (21.6)	−14.4 (6.1)	−14.5 (5.9)
Average precipitation mm (inches)	54.8 (2.16)	36.6 (1.44)	44.5 (1.75)	63.0 (2.48)	60.1 (2.37)	37.4 (1.47)	38.4 (1.51)	40.2 (1.58)	105.3 (4.15)	94.5 (3.72)	96.6 (3.80)	48.2 (1.90)	719.6 (28.33)
Average precipitation days (≥ 1.0 mm)	5.5	4.4	4.9	7.0	6.2	4.3	3.2	3.6	5.4	6.9	7.7	5.6	64.8
Average relative humidity (%)	77	74	69	66	66	64	71	78	78	79	71	77	72.5
Source 1: Meteociel
Source 2: Infoclimat.fr (humidity 1961–1990)

== See also ==
- Communes of the Vaucluse department
