= Aubignan =

- Commune
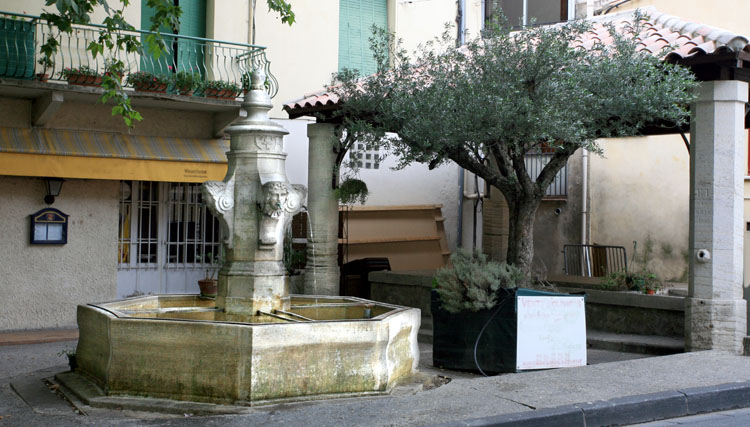
- Fountain and old wash house

- Coat of arms
- Location of Aubignan
- Location within France Location within Provence-Alpes-Côte d'Azur
- Coordinates: 44°06′02″N 5°01′33″E
- Country: France
- Region: Provence-Alpes-Côte d'Azur
- Department: Vaucluse
- Arrondissement: Carpentras
- Canton: Carpentras
- Intercommunality: CA Ventoux-Comtat Venaissin

Government
  - Mayor (2020–2026): Siegfried Bielle
- Area^{1}: 15.7 km^{2} (6.1 sq mi)
- Elevation: 56 m (184 ft)
- Highest elevation: 153 m (502 ft)
- Lowest elevation: 41 m (135 ft)
- Population (2023): 5,981
  - Density: 381/km^{2} (987/sq mi)
- Time zone: UTC+01:00 (CET)
  - Summer (DST): UTC+02:00 (CEST)
- INSEE/Postal code: 84004 /84810
- ^{1} French Land Register data, which excludes lakes, ponds, glaciers > 1 km^{2} (0.386 sq mi or 247 acres) and river estuaries.

Aubignan (French pronunciation: [obiɲɑ̃]; Provençal: Aubinhan) is a commune in the Vaucluse department in the Provence-Alpes-Côte d'Azur region in southeastern France. Close to Beaumes-de-Venise and the famous Côtes du Rhône vineyards, Aubignan is, itself, locally famous for the production of wine, and of young vines and vine grafts.

== Geography ==
The village is located to the North of Carpentras, and is part of the Comtat Venaissin. It is built on a hill.

== Twin towns ==
The commune is twinned with Cheseaux-sur-Lausanne, Switzerland, and Barrow-and-Littleton, United Kingdom.

== Population ==
Historical population
Year	Pop.	±% p.a.
1968	1,819	—
1975	2,126	+2.25%
1982	2,230	+0.68%
1990	3,347	+5.21%
1999	3,837	+1.53%
2007	4,619	+2.35%
2012	5,244	+2.57%
2017	5,661	+1.54%
2023	5,981	+0.92%
Source: INSEE

== Public transport ==
The village is served by two bus lines, run by Trans'Cove: line A and line J. The three most important railway stations are Avignon, Orange and Carpentras.

== Places of interest ==
- canal of Carpentras
- fountain and old wash house
- Moulin-Neuf pond
- France Gate, part of the ancient town walls
- Parish Church (Notre-Dame-de-l'Annonciation-et-Saint-Victor-Martyr)
- St. Sixte Chapel

== Notable people ==
- François Arnaud (1721-1784), Abbot and writer, born in Aubignan, member or the Académie française
- Louis Guichard (1866-1951), politician, born in Aubignan
- Maxime Richaud (1924-1994), painter, born in Aubignan
- Ibrahim Shahda (1929-1991), painter, who worked in Aubignan.

== See also ==
- Communes of the Vaucluse department
