= Ibrahim Shahda =

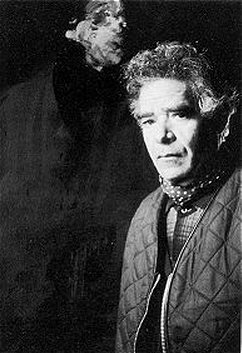
- Shahda standing next to a self-portrait
- Born: 2 October 1929; Al-Azizya, Egypt
- Died: 28 August 1991 (aged 61); Aix-en-Provence, France
- Education: Pierre Beppi-Martin
- Known for: painting
- Notable work: Self-portraits, still-lifes, landscapes
- Awards: Avignon Festival Painting Prize, Aix-en-Provence Painting Prize

Ibrahim Shahda (2 October 1929 – 28 August 1991) was an Egyptian-born French figurative painter.

== Biography ==
Born in Al-Azizya, Egypt, Shahda studied at the Cairo Fine Arts Academy in 1947, aged 18. He worked with French professor and painter Pierre Beppi-Martin. In 1955, three years after ending his studies, he won a Prize and organized his first exhibition. At the end of the same year, he decided to leave for Paris.

He applied as free student to the École des Beaux-Arts. He moved to the south of France, in Carpentras, but frequently traveled to Paris.

A first personal exhibition took place in 1958 at the Arlette Chabaud Gallery in Avignon. He won the Painting Prize from the Avignon Festival with La femme en noir, today part of the Fondation Calvet collection (Calvet Museum). He also won the Aix-en-Provence Painting Prize the same year. A second exhibition, shared with his friend Paul Surtel, was organized in Carpentras (Chapelle du Collège) in 1960.

In 1962, unhappy with his work, he chose to return to Paris. In 1963 he visited Italy, then Brittany. In 1966, he returned to Provence, but spent several summers in Brittany.

The following decade saw him visit Belgium, Netherlands, Spain and Italy, and show his work in Paris (Egypt Cultural Center), in Avignon (Ducastel Gallery), in Carpentras (Town-Hall) and in Marseille. During each trip he visited museums and admired the great masters.

In 1975, Shahda fell seriously ill. He kept on painting, but felt threatened: "One must snatch work from passing time.". During a long remission, he worked on portraits - including those of fellow artists such as painter Michel Bonnaud or writer Pierre Autin-Grenier - and self-portraits, oil or pastel drawing.

Two exhibitions took place in Carpentras in 1981 and 1984. His health deteriorated again in 1985, but he kept on working harder than ever: still lifes, self-portraits and, despite illness and exhaustion, landscapes.

He died from cancer during the summer of 1991 in Aix-en-Provence hospital.

His widow, Anita, organized many posthumous exhibitions, in Paris, in various Provence towns, in Montpellier and in Ajaccio. She worked for years on a monograph which was published in 2014.

== Work ==
The Fondation Calvet in Avignon owns two paintings by Shahda, La Femme en noir from 1958 and a Self-portrait from the late 70s.

The Auberive Abbey and Musée Comtadin-Duplessis in Carpentras also host some of his work.

His style is highly personal, but has a clear link with some great painters of the past (Frans Hals, Rembrandt, Van Dyck, Goya, Velázquez, Titian and Tintoretto, or van Gogh, Cézanne, Modigliani and Soutine), as well as two of his contemporaries, Zoran Mušič and Francis Bacon, by the strength of his portraits and the refusal of abstract art.

Artists like painters Lucie Geffré and Ronan Barrot and sculptor Marc Petit have been influenced by Shahda's work.

=== Exhibitions ===
- 1958: Galerie Arlette Chabaud, Avignon
- 1960: Chapelle du Collège, Carpentras (exhibition with Paul Surtel)
- 1964: Musée Lapidaire, Carpentras
- 1966: Galerie Ducastel, Avignon
- 1967: Musée Lapidaire, Carpentras
- 1969: Centre Culturel d'Egypte, Paris
- 1971: Galerie Ducastel, Avignon
- 1971: Galerie Lucy Krohg, Paris
- 1972: Hôtel de Ville, Carpentras
- 1974: Galerie Ducastel, Avignon
- 1974: National Fair Club, Marseille
- 1975: Galerie Ducastel, Avignon
- 1981: Musée Duplessis and Chapelle du Collège, Carpentras
- 1984: La Charité, Carpentras

=== Posthumous exhibitions ===
- 1993: Chapelle du Collège, Carpentras
- 1994: Musée Municipal, Alès
- 1995: Château de Malijay, Jonquières
- 1998: Galerie Doudou Bayol, Saint-Rémy-de-Provence
- 1998: Ferme des Arts, Vaison-la-Romaine
- 1998: Centre Culturel d'Egypte, Paris
- 1999: Espace Saint-Louis, Avignon
- 2000: Chapelle du Grozeau, Malaucène
- 2003: Galerie Artset, Limoges
- 2006: Chapelle du Collège, Carpentras
- 2009: Galerie Polad-Hardouin, Paris
- 2011: Galerie Anna-Tschopp, Marseille
- 2011: Galerie Ardital, Aix-en-Provence
- 2012: Galerie de l'Ecusson, Montpellier
- 2013: Lazaret Ollandini, Musée Marc Petit, Ajaccio
- 2014: Imprimerie Rimbaud, Cavaillon, for the monograph publication

== Publications ==
- 1984: Magazine Rencontres, #124
- 2005: Magazine Azart, #17
- 2009: Exhibition catalog at Polad-Hardouin Gallery, Ibrahim Shahda, La Rinascita
- 2009: Magazine Vernissages, #5, Ibrahim Shahda, Chronique d'une Survie
- 2014: Shahda, monograph, by Anita Shahda

Illustrations

- Pierre Autin-Grenier, Élodie Cordou, une présence, Éditions du Chemin de fer, 2015; with paintings by Ibrahim Shahda ISBN 978-2-916130-73-6
