= Louis Archimbaud =

Louis Archimbaud (November 1705 – 13 May 1789) was a Comtadin composer. He was one of the last representatives of the Baroque style of French organ school.

Archimbaud was born in Carpentras and educated there in the Carpentras Cathedral school. He became an acolyte, then a singer, and finally, in 1727, organist of the cathedral. He occupied this post until his death in 1789. Ten years before he died the church authorities made him an honorary canon.

Neither the composer nor the music were known until the late 1990s, when Joseph Scherpereel discovered seven autograph manuscripts at the Bibliothèque Inguimbertine of Carpentras. Archimbaud's works include a massive Livre d'orgue [de Carpentras], six masses, two Magnificats and four settings of Dixit Dominus. The organ collection contains 408 pieces organized by liturgical function and mode: two volumes of preludes, one volume of elevations, three volumes of offertories and a compilation titled Miscellanea that includes pieces from several volumes and contains indications that at least one more autograph manuscript is still to be found. Most of the works are comparatively brief, occupying no more than a page of music; the offertories average two pages. The style combines simple, songlike melodies, and features that are typical of French Baroque organ music.

== See also ==
- French organ school
