= Jean-François Delmas =

Jean-François Delmas may refer to:

- Jean-François Delmas (bass-baritone) (1861–1933), French opera singer
- Jean-François Delmas (palaeographer) (born 1964), French palaeographer and librarian
- Jean-François-Bertrand Delmas (1751–1798), French revolutionary politician
