= Louis de Fortia-Montréal =

French Roman Catholic prelate

Most Reverend Louis de Fortia-Montréal
- Bishop of Carpentras
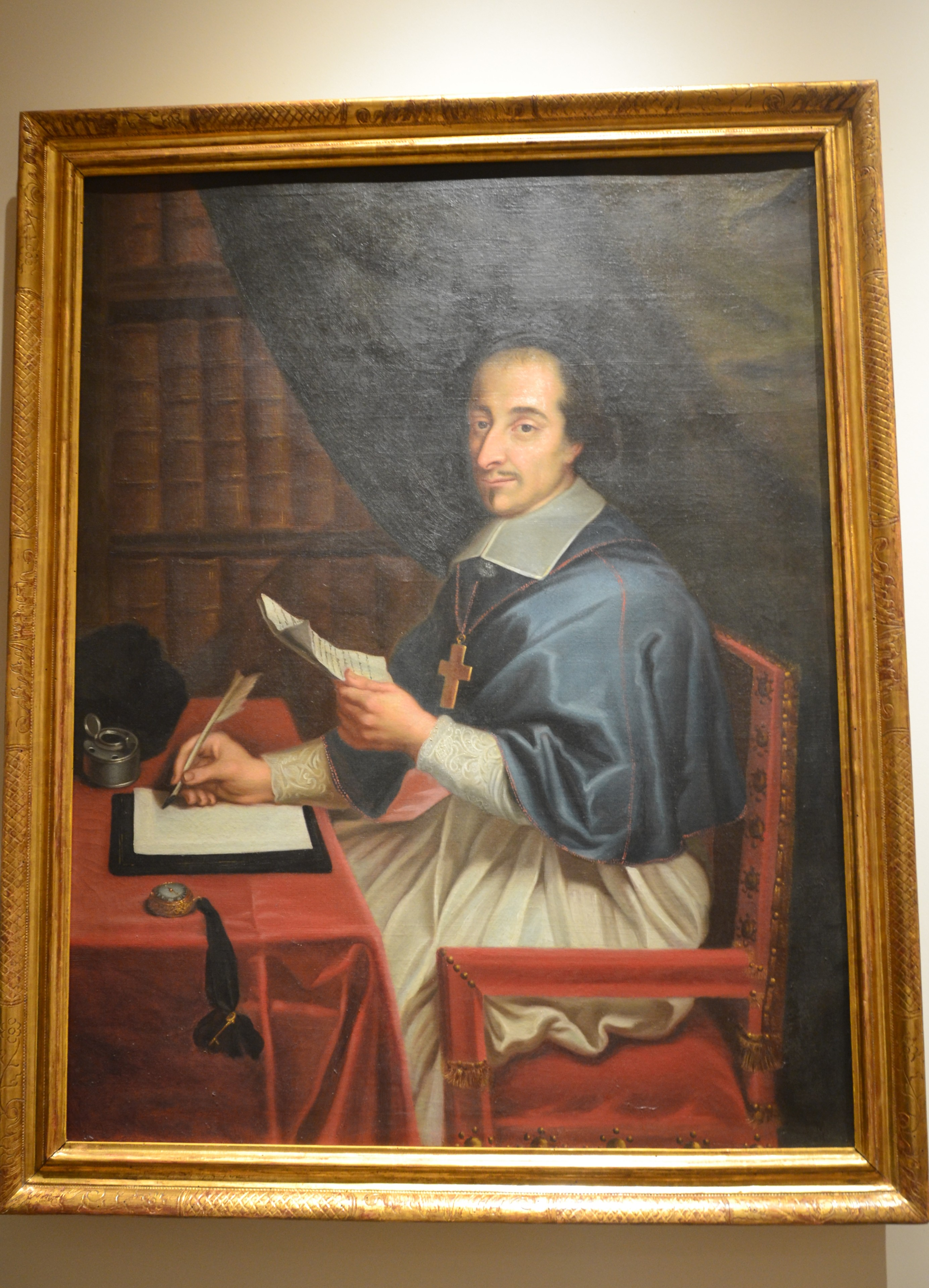
- Church: Catholic Church
- Diocese: Diocese of Carpentras
- In office: 1657–1661
- Predecessor: Alessandro Bichi
- Successor: Gaspard de Lascaris
- Previous post: Bishop of Cavaillon (1646–1656)

Orders
- Consecration: 23 September 1646 by Pier Luigi Carafa

Personal details
- Born: 1618 Avignon, France
- Died: 26 April 1661 (age 43) Carpentras, France

Louis de Fortia-Montréal (1618–1661) was a Roman Catholic prelate who served as Bishop of Carpentras (1657–1661) and Bishop of Cavaillon (1646–1656).

== Biography ==
Louis de Fortia-Montréal was born in Avignon, France in 1618 and ordained a deacon on 9 June 1646. On 10 September 1646, he was appointed during the papacy of Pope Innocent X as Bishop of Cavaillon. On 23 September 1646, he was consecrated bishop by Pier Luigi Carafa, Cardinal-Priest of Santi Silvestro e Martino ai Monti, with Alphonse Sacrati, Bishop Emeritus of Comacchio, and Ranuccio Scotti Douglas, Bishop of Borgo San Donnino, serving as co-consecrators. On 26 June 1656, he was appointed during the papacy of Pope Alexander VII as Coadjutor Bishop of Carpentras and succeeded to the bishopric on 25 May 1657. He served as Bishop of Carpentras until his death on 26 April 1661.

== Episcopal succession ==
While bishop, he was the principal co-consecrator of:

- Francesco de' Marini, Bishop of Albenga (1655); and
- Juan de Paredes, Bishop of Castellammare di Stabia (1655).

Catholic Church titles
Preceded by Fabrice de La Bourdaisière	Bishop of Cavaillon; 1646–1656	Succeeded by François Hallier
Preceded by Alessandro Bichi	Bishop of Carpentras; 1657–1661	Succeeded by Gaspard de Lascaris
