= Étienne Dantoine =

French sculptor

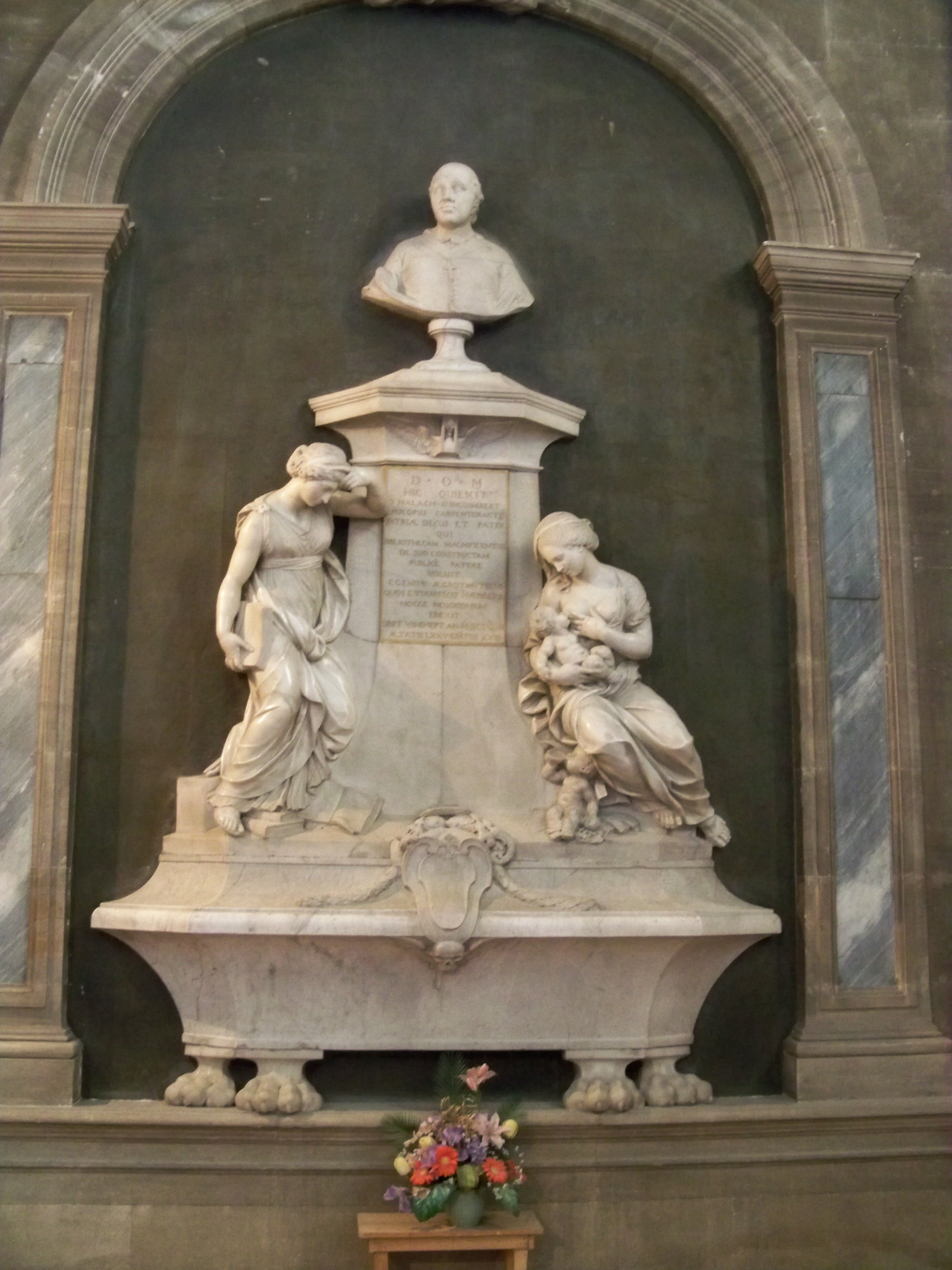
funeral monument of Bishop Inguimbert sculpted by Étienne Dantoine, Hôtel-Dieu of Carpentras, 1774

Étienne Dantoine, also Etienne d'Antoine, (20 February 1737 – 23 March 1809) was a French sculptor.

Born in Marseille, where he studied drawing and sculpting at the Académie royale de peinture et de sculpture while apprenticed to a potter. After a stay in Rome where he won a Prix de Rome, he returned to France and sculpted the funeral monument of Bishop Inguimbert (1774), which was placed in the choir of the chapel of the Hôtel-Dieu of Carpentras. He then received an annuity granted by the city of Montpellier to execute for them a fountain of The Three Graces (1776) in Place de la Comédie. He then moved to Paris where he married and returned to Marseille. Misfortunes soon hit the artist: his wife died, and the city of Montpellier stopped paying him his pension. In 1799 he was admitted to the Académie de Marseille. Dantoine executed exhibitions between 1800 and 1803 with a draft public monument representing Languedoc in the form of a connecting Engineering Ocean and the Mediterranean, an allusion to the channel and the two seas. He also presented a globe of the world upon which Justice, Wisdom and Prudence presided. In 1806 he sculpted the cenotaph of General Desaix, consisting of a marble urn on the top of a granite column, which now resides at Château Borély.
