= Hôtel de Ville, Carpentras =

Town hall in Carpentras, France

Hôtel de Ville
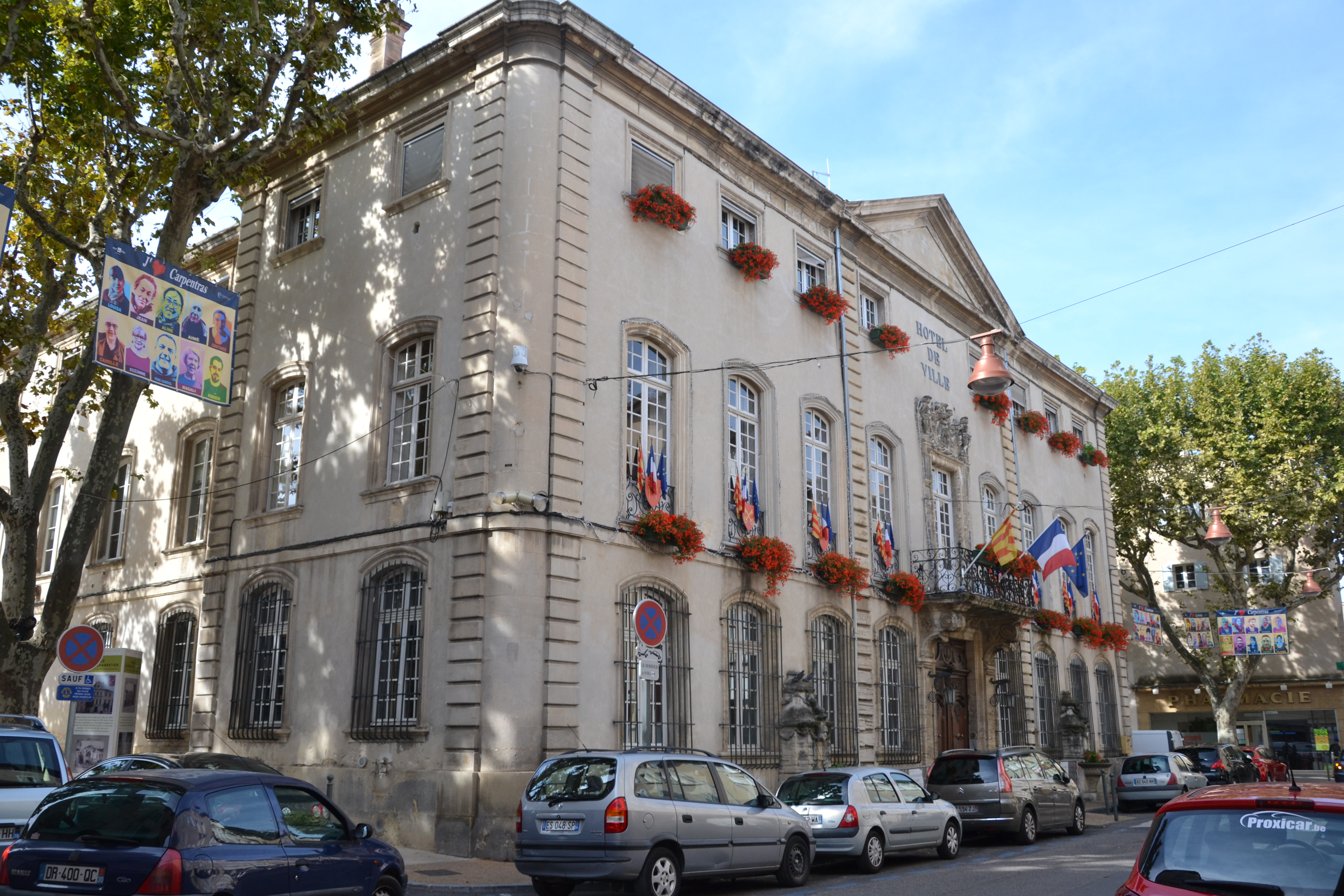
- The original north facing frontage of the Hôtel de Ville in September 2018
- Interactive map of the Hôtel de Ville area

General information
- Type: City hall
- Architectural style: Neoclassical style
- Location: Carpentras, France
- Coordinates: 44.0556°N 5.0488°E
- Completed: 1740

The Hôtel de Ville (French pronunciation: [otɛl də vil], City Hall) is a municipal building in Carpentras, Vaucluse, in southeastern France, standing on Rue des Halles. It has been included on the Inventaire général des monuments by the French Ministry of Culture since 2002.

== History ==
The consuls held meetings in various locations around the town until 1470 when they decided to acquire a house, known as "Le Champenois," on Place du Château from Aeneas Andardi for 340 gold florins. They demolished the house and a local mason, Blaise Lécuyer, erected the first town hall on the site.

After the first town hall burnt down in November 1713, the local bishop, Joseph-Dominique d'Inguimbert, led an initiative to find a new and more substantial town hall. At that time, the town was part of the enclave of Comtat Venaissin, which was part of the Papal States. The building they selected, on the south side of what is now Rue des Halles, was owned by the Marquis of Laroque. After the building was acquired for 36,000 livres in 1738, a major programme of restoration works, involving the replacement of the north façade, was undertaken and completed in around 1740.

The design involved a symmetrical main frontage of nine bays facing onto Rue des Halles. The central section of three bays featured a large double panel doorway with a stone surround flanked by brackets supporting a balcony with an iron railing. There was a French door surmounted by a coat of arms on the first floor and a sign saying "Hôtel de Ville" on the second floor. All the other bays were fenestrated by segmental headed windows on the first two floors and by smaller square windows on the second floor. There were quoins at the edges of the central section and of the building itself and, at roof level, there was a pediment over the central section. Two fountains were placed against the main façade of the building at that time. Internally, the principal room was the Salle du Conseil (council chamber) which was established on the first floor of the building.

In October 1797, only six years after the annexation of Comtat Venaissin by France, a group of 130 counter-revolutionaries who still supported the ancien régime attacked the town hall. The consuls, supported by just eight men, took refuge in the building. The next day troops arrived from Avignon to quell the disturbance. However, two people died and four were wounded in the clashes.

In the late 19th century, the town council decided to extend the town hall to the south with a whole new block, similar in size to the existing structure, facing onto a new square. The work was financed through a bequest by a local benefactor, Isidore Moricelly. The site they acquired for this work had been the home of the local Jewish ghetto which had accommodated nearly 2,000 people at the end of the previous century. The foundation stone for the new block was laid on the centenary of the annexation of Comtat Venaissin by France, 14 September 1891. It was built in a similar style to the original block and was completed in around 1895. However, in contrast to the original block, the central section of three bays was slightly projected forward and was surmounted, at roof level, by a clock rather than a pediment.

Following the liberation of the town by the American 3rd Infantry Division on 25 August 1944, during the Second World War, a delegation of members of the French Resistance was installed in the town hall.

== Sources ==
- Liabastres, Joseph (1891). Histoire de Carpentras. Léon Barrier.
