= Siffredus of Carpentras =

Saint Siffredus
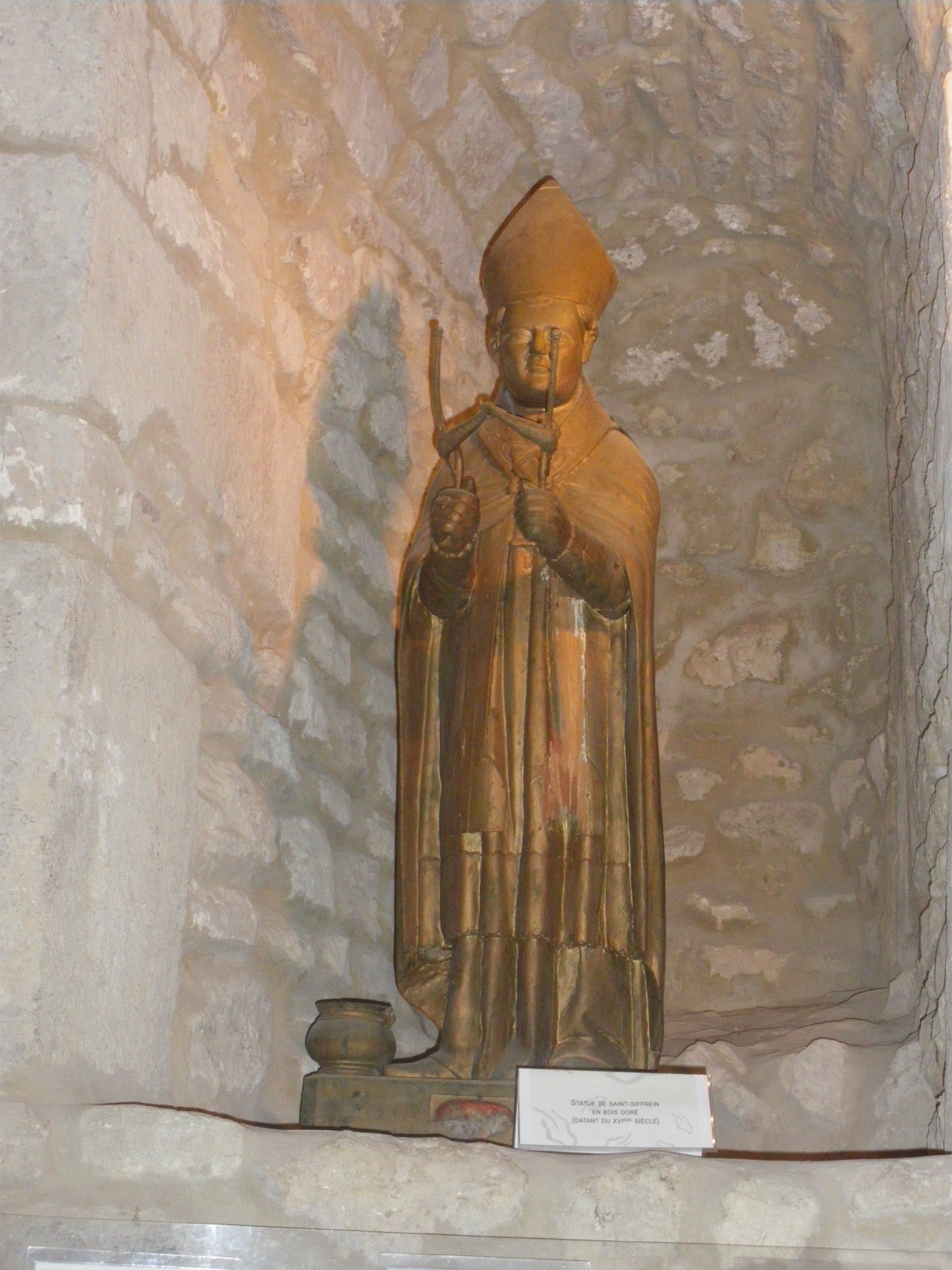
- Venasque - St Siffrein

Bishop
- Died: 7th century Venasque
- Venerated in: Roman Catholic Church
- Feast: 27 November
- Patronage: Carpentras, France

Saint Siffredus of Carpentras (French: Siffrein) was a bishop of Carpentras who is venerated as a saint by the Catholic Church.

Siffredus was a monk in Lérins Abbey before becoming bishop of Carpentras at the beginning of the seventh century. Not much is known of his life and Siffredus does not appear to have participated in any church council. However, during his episcopate, he ordered the construction of many churches in Carpentras and in Venasque.

Religious and popular tradition holds that Siffredus led an austere life and was zealous in his pastoral duties, caring for the poor and exorcising demons.

== Veneration ==
The traditional date of his death, 27 November, was fixed as his feast day as early as the eleventh century, when his name appears in local martyrologies. Siffredus’ body was translated sometime before the thirteenth century from Venasque to Carpentras. His relics were saved from destruction during the French Revolution by a priest in 1793, and are still preserved in Carpentras Cathedral, which is dedicated to him.
