= Roux Graineterie of Carpentras =

- Graineterie Roux de Carpentras
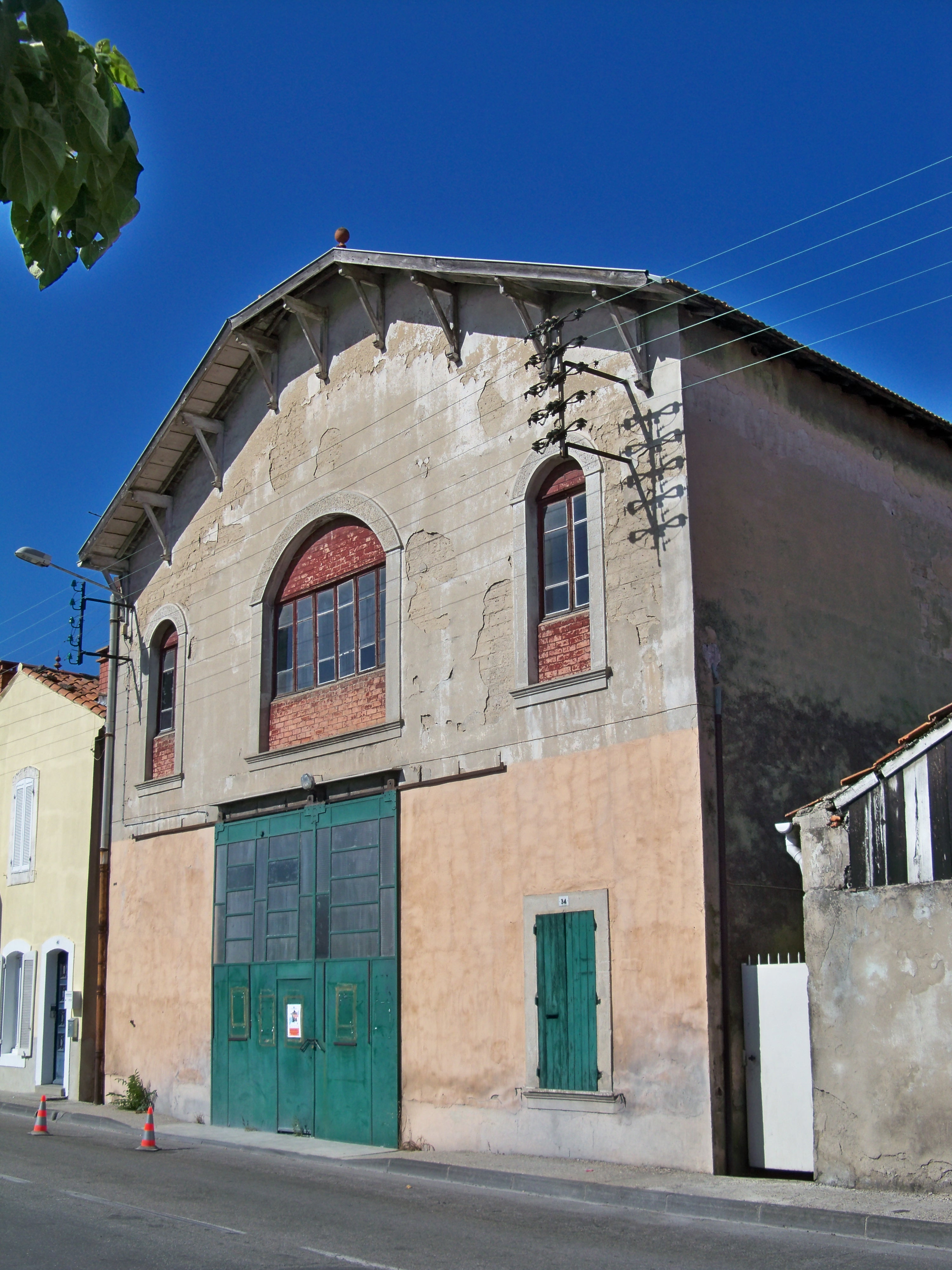

- Location within France
- Alternative names: Graineterie Aimé Roux

General information
- Status: standing
- Location: Carpentras, France, 34 rue Bel Air
- Coordinates: 44.0504°N 5.0429°E
- Construction started: 1907
- Completed: 1920
- Opened: 1919
- Owner: Town of Carpentras

The Roux Graineterie of Carpentras, seed company founded in 1907, at 34 rue Bel Air Carpentras in Vaucluse, France is an outstanding example of this industry, which now has five such institutions in France of which only two are classified as historical monuments (one in Carignan in Ardennes and the other monastic barn 14th century to Blois in Loir-et-Cher ). Since the order of September 9, 2005, the building has been listed as a monument. Graineterie worked for nearly a century from 1919 until the early 2000s.

== Successive owners ==
In 1913, Albert Simon, a merchant seeds Sorgues, bought the mill built by Pierre Nicolas, and completed two years earlier than Bel Air in Carpentras. He installed a seed treatment business under the name of Maison Albert Simon called the Moulin. In 1917, his daughter married Aimé Roux and received the mill dot. He gave the Graineterie Roux the official title of Souville Factory, founded in 1919. Its main activity is the decortication of seeds but also the packaging and trading of seeds produced by the local market, destination food sector (rice, rapeseed, sunflower, psyllium, ...). Located near the Carpentras Station, including freight activity has never ceased distributing its products on a national scale.

In the early 1920s, the first expansion of the mill operates, as well as the construction of a first floor. In 1928, the entire building is raised and a new facade is made. At that time, the new machines are purchased to build new production lines.

During the Second World War, was requisitioned graineterie: line decortication is used to treat rice and also, as stated in the oral tradition, split peas. In 1949, Aimé Roux institutions are created. André Roux, son of the founder, became plant manager in 1951 and made arrange the laboratory. It obtains authorization for seed multiplication.

In the middle of 1980, as a result of a bankruptcy, the plant became graineterie Bel-Air. In the late 1990s, Maurice Fra farmer and customer, praised graineterie and designated the activity to Fra Shelling.

Currently, the factory is also involved in treating various types of grains (cereals, oilseed, protein) provided by local farmers and for food, in terms of the legislation of products from organic farming (the ECOCERT).
