= Arch of Carpentras =

Roman Arch in France

Coordinates: 44.0544°N 5.0475°E

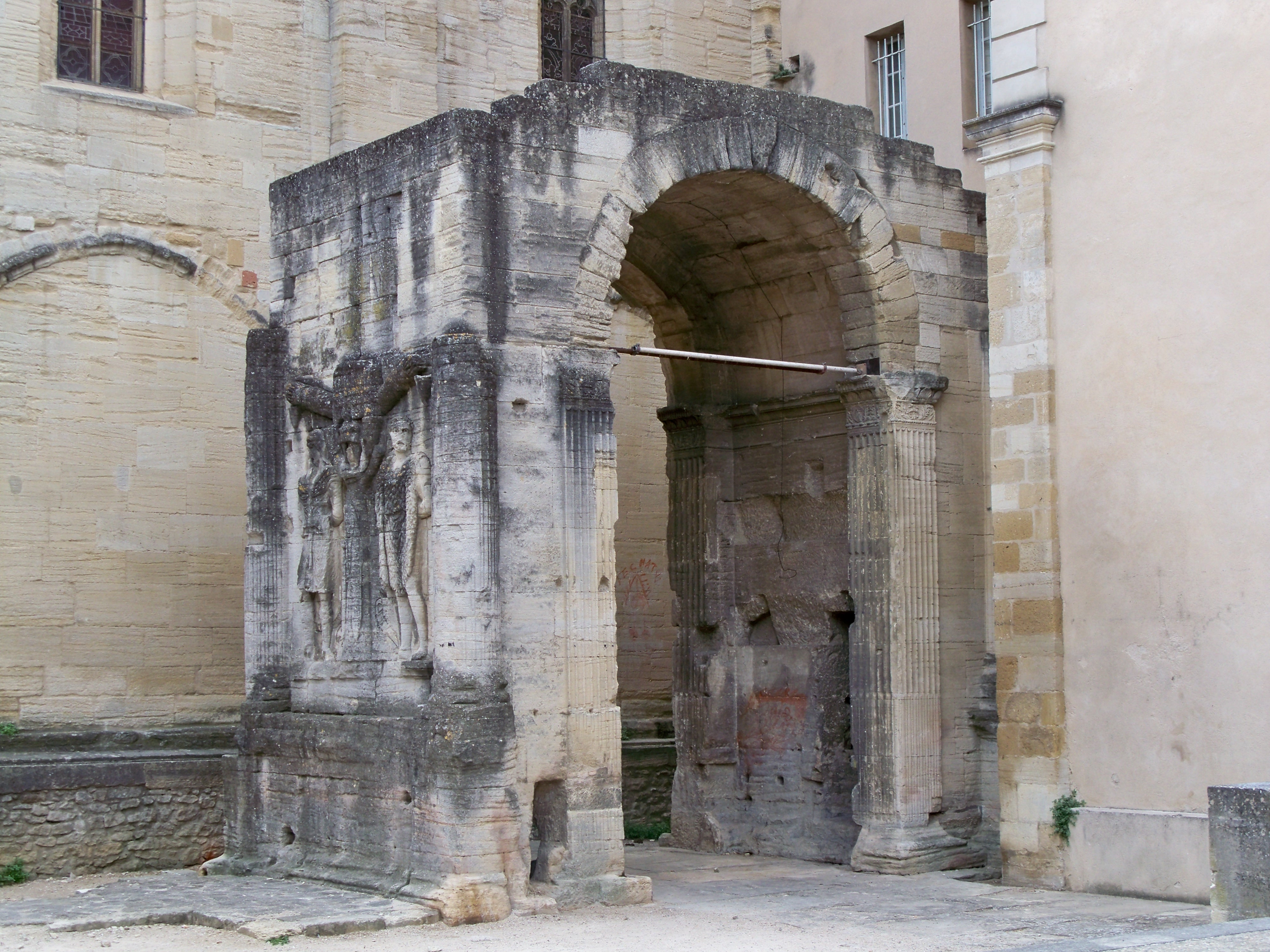
Roman arch of Carpentras

The Arch of Carpentras is a Roman triumphal arch from the beginning of the first century AD, located at Carpentras in the French department of Vaucluse.

It has a single fornix, framed by fluted lesenes and decorated with an archivolt of vine tendrils. At the outer corners there are engaged columns. On the sides there are images of trophies flanked by barbarian prisoners. These trophy reliefs are also found on the short sides of the Arch of Orange, which is however more richly decorated.

The arch was originally located on the city's cardo maximus. Later it was incorporated into the old cathedral as an access door and still later into the episcopal palace (now the courthouse).

The arch was included in the first list of French historic monuments in 1840.

== Interpretation ==
Various theories have been proposed for the motivation for its construction. The theories are essentially based on the interpretation of the barbarian prisoners on the two reliefs (on the west side a German and an eastern barbarian with a Phrygian beard, another eastern barbarian and a person with a diadem which might indicate a Hellenistic king on the east side).

- Gilbert Picard has proposed that the arch was built to symbolically commemorate the victory of Augustus in the eastern and northern regions. Pierre Gros also proposed a date before 10 AD on the basis of the decorative motifs and a reference to the theme of Augustus' universal victory in the face of the succession issue of the last years of this Emperor's reign.
- R. Turcan has instead suggested that it was a celebration of the victories of Tiberius in the east and west in the years 18–19, perhaps related to the foundation of the colonia Julia Meminorum at Carpentras.

== See also ==
- List of Roman triumphal arches
