= Canton of Carpentras =

Coordinates: 44.05°N 5.05°E

- Canton
- Situation of the canton of Carpentras in the department of Vaucluse
- Country: France
- Region: Provence-Alpes-Côte d'Azur
- Department: Vaucluse
- No. of communes: {{{nbcomm}}}
- Population (2023): 40,086
- INSEE code: 8406

The canton of Carpentras is an administrative division of the Vaucluse department, in southeastern France. It was created at the French canton reorganisation which came into effect in March 2015. Its seat is in Carpentras.

It consists of the following communes:

1. Aubignan
2. Carpentras
3. Loriol-du-Comtat
