= Carpentras Cathedral =

Cathedral in Vaucluse, France

Coordinates: 44°3′15″N 5°2′52″E

Carpentras Cathedral Cathédrale Saint-Siffrein de Carpentras
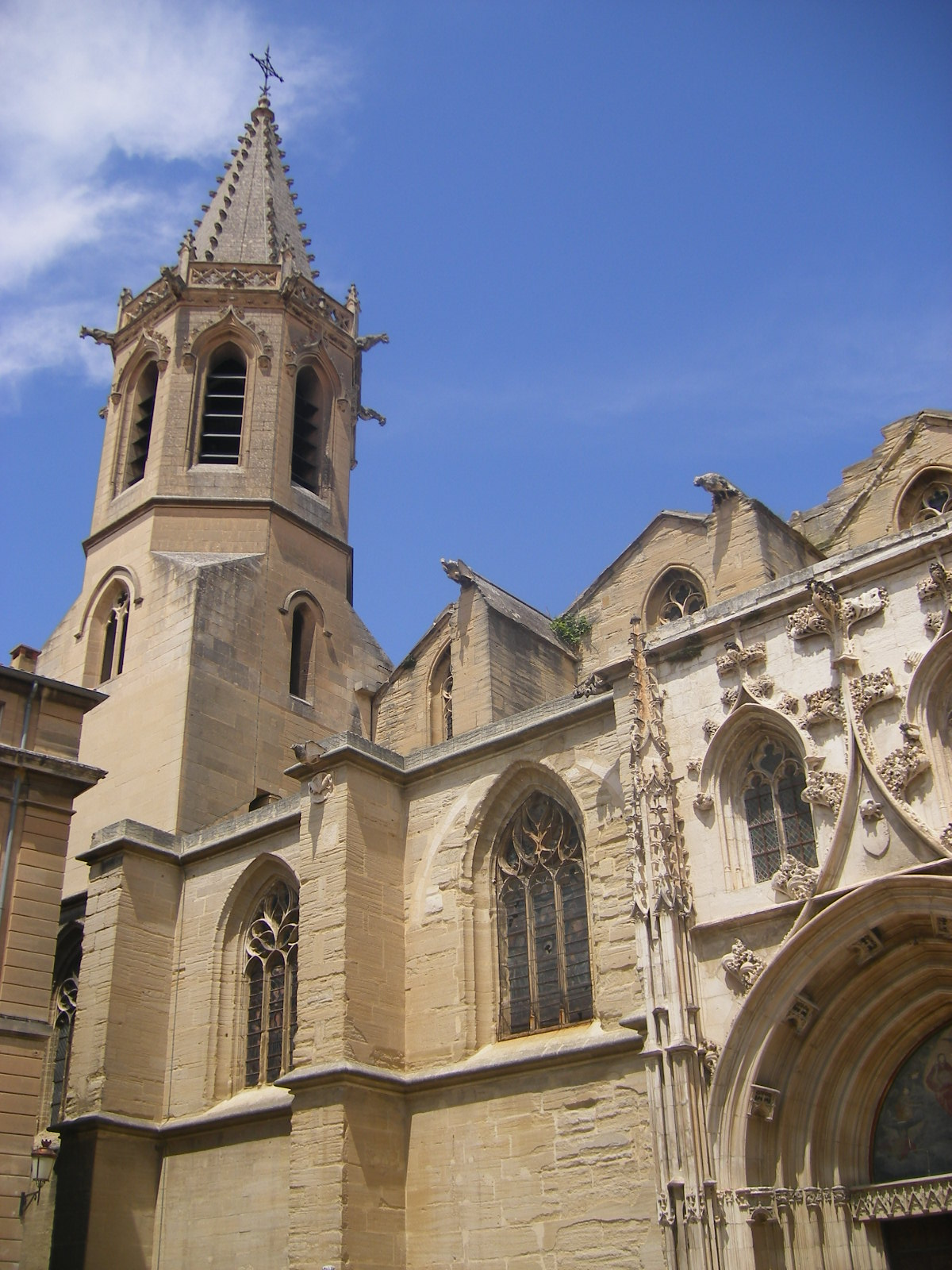
- Carpentras Cathedral

Religion
- Affiliation: Roman Catholic
- Province: Bishop of Carpentras
- Region: Vaucluse
- Ecclesiastical or organisational status: Cathedral
- Status: Active

Location
- Location: Carpentras, France
- Interactive map of Carpentras Cathedral; Cathédrale Saint-Siffrein de Carpentras

Architecture
- Type: church
- Style: Romanesque
- Groundbreaking: 15th century

Carpentras Cathedral (Cathédrale Saint-Siffrein de Carpentras) is a Roman Catholic church and former cathedral in Carpentras, Provence, France.

The church was built in the 15th century by the order of Benedict XIII. The site used to be a Roman cathedral. Construction started in 1409 and continued for 150 years, with seven different architects working on the building. The main entrance was built in 1512–1514, then modified a hundred years later, and then modified again in 2000–2002. The tower was built in the early 20th century. The cathedral building is a national monument of France.

Until the 19th century Carpentras Cathedral was the seat of the bishops of Carpentras, to one of whom, Saint Siffredus (French: Saint Siffrein), it is dedicated. However, the diocese was abolished in the Concordat of 1801 and added to the Diocese of Avignon; the cathedral became a church.

Nicolas Saboly, a Provençal poet and composer, served as maître de chapelle of the cathedral in 1639–1643. Louis Archimbaud served as organist of the cathedral from 1727 to 1789.
