= Bibliothèque Inguimbertine =

Inguimbertine Library
- Bibliothèque Inguimbertine
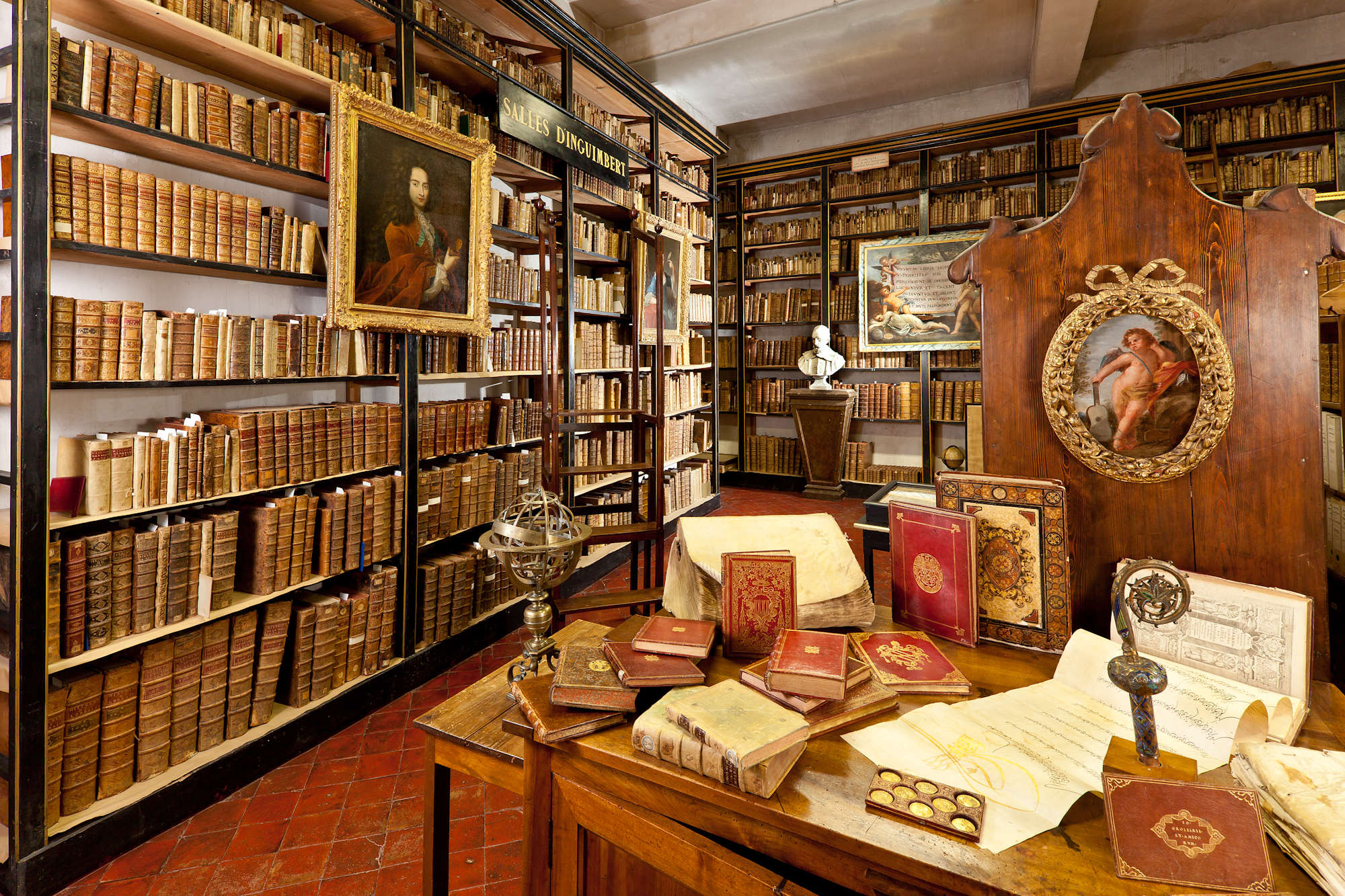
- 44°3′21″N 5°2′56″E
- Location: Carpentras, France
- Type: Library
- Established: 1735

Collection
- Size: 220,000 books

The Bibliothèque Inguimbertine is a scholarly library located in Carpentras. It was established by Joseph-Dominique d'Inguimbert, the Bishop of Carpentras from 1735 to 1754. It has been called "the oldest of our municipal libraries" by chief librarian Jean-François Delmas. It currently contains about 220,000 books.

In 2013, the council decided to move the library into roomier quarters in the former Hôtel-Dieu. Refurbishment works to accommodate the library were completed in April 2024.

== See also ==
- List of libraries in France
