= Jean-Joseph-Xavier Bidauld =

French painter (1758–1846)

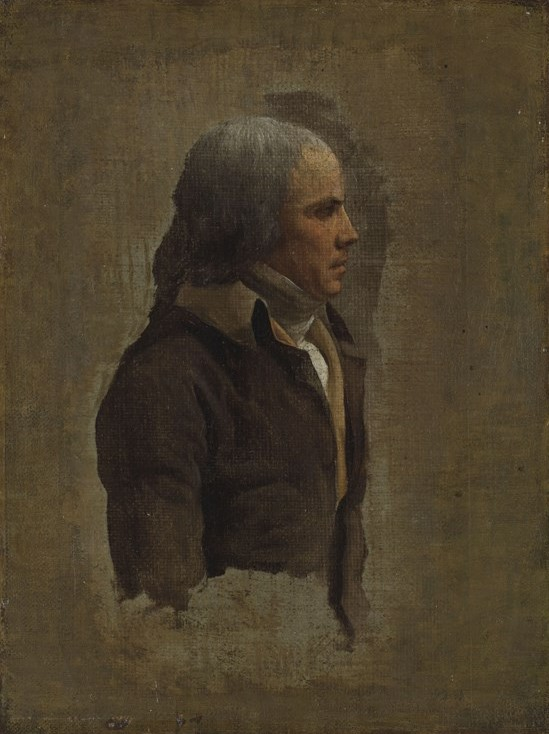
Bidauld by Louis-Léopold Boilly, c. 1800

Jean-Joseph-Xavier Bidauld (10 April 1758 – 20 October 1846) was a French painter.

A native of the city of Carpentras, Bidauld first studied painting with his elder brother, Jean-Pierre-Xavier, in Lyons. In 1783 he traveled to Paris, while there, he won the favor of an art dealer and perfume seller named Dulac. This latter subsidized Bidauld's travels in Italy, where for five years he lived in Rome and traveled widely. Most of his contacts within the French artistic community in that city were history painters.

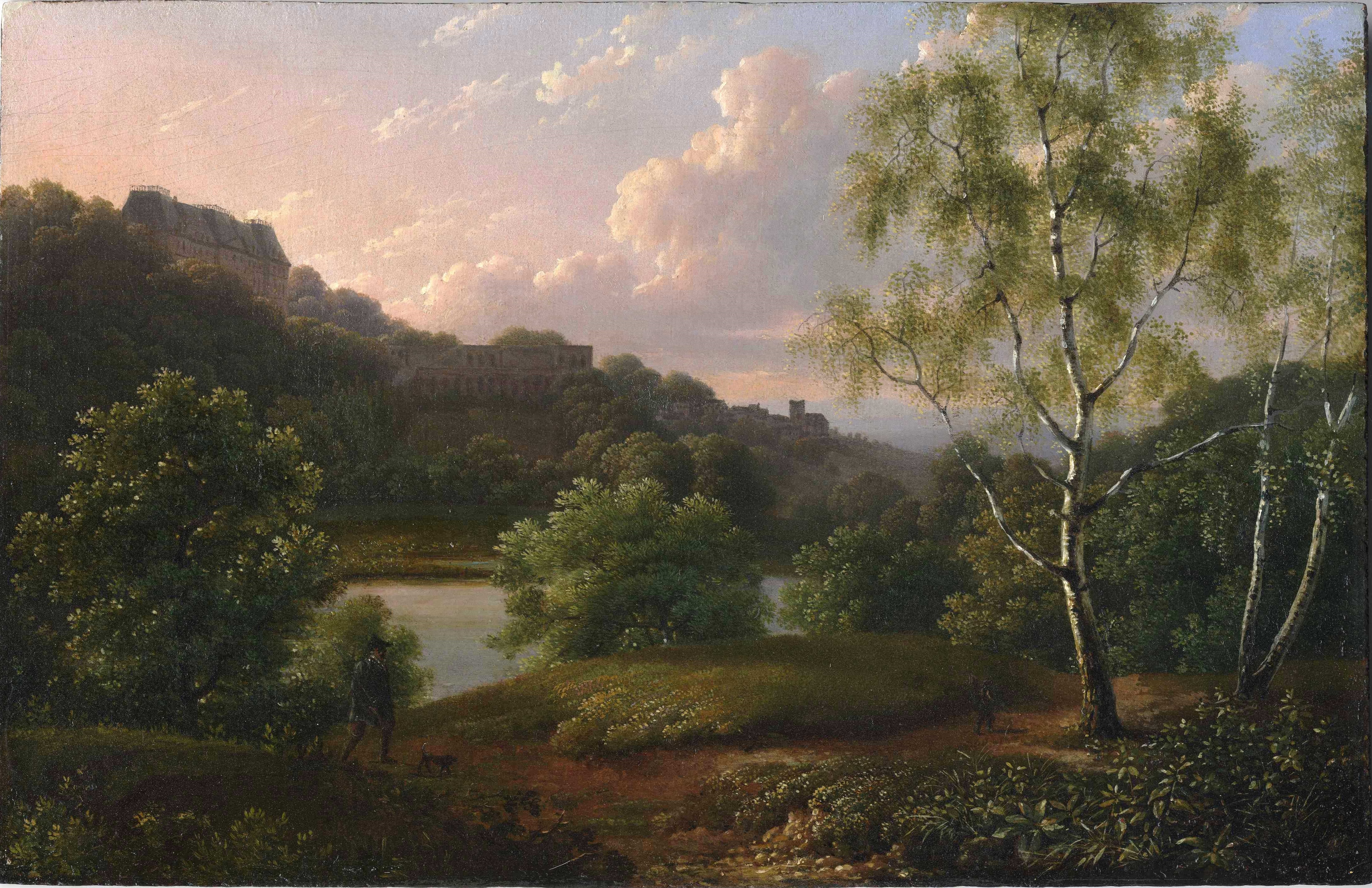
Jean-Joseph-Xavier Bidauld, View of the castle of Meudon, 1846. Museum of art and history of Meudon

In 1790 Bidauld returned to Paris; in 1791 he entered the Salon for the first time. Thereafter he participated regularly. In 1792 he began receiving official commissions, and in 1823 he became the first landscape painter elected to the Académie des Beaux-Arts. 1825 saw him awarded the Légion d'honneur. His reputation began to decline at about this time; as a member of the Salon jury, he was seen as blocking a new generation of landscape painters from gaining entry. Chief among these was Théodore Rousseau. Bidauld was savaged in the press, and as a result, became unable to sell his work. By the time of his death, he was near penury.

In 1800, François-Adrien Boieldieu dedicated to Bidauld his opera Le Calife de Bagdad.

Camille Corot was among Bidauld's admirers during his career.
