= Jacopo Sadoleto =

Italian cardinal (1477–1547)

His Eminence Jacopo Sadoleto
- Bishop of Carpentras
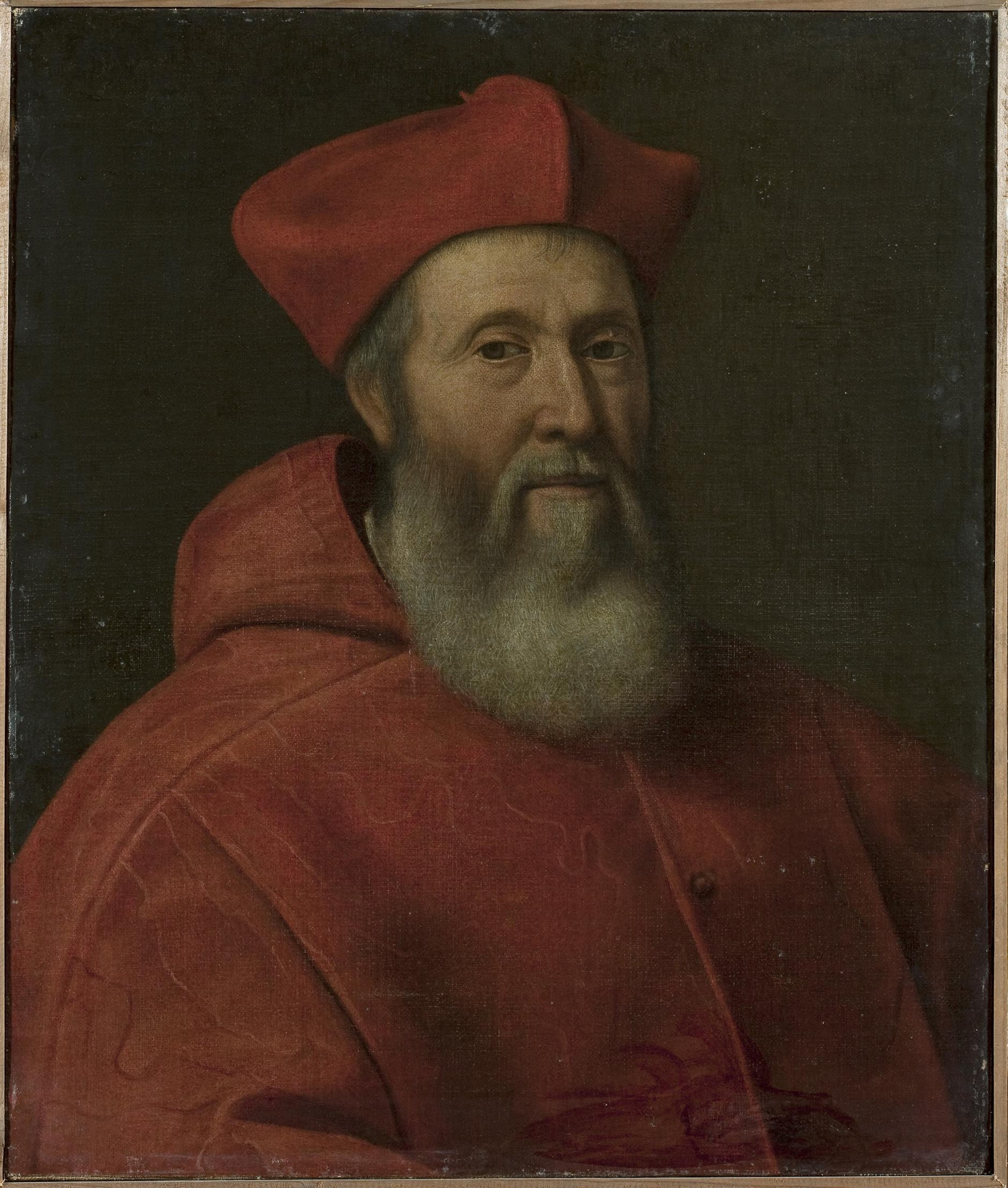
- Portrait by Jacopino del Conte, c. 1537
- Church: Catholic Church
- Diocese: Carpentras
- Appointed: 24 April 1517
- Term ended: 18 October 1547
- Predecessor: Pierre de Valletariis
- Successor: Paolo Sadoleto
- Previous posts: Cardinal-Priest of San Callisto (1537-1545); Cardinal-Priest of Santa Balbina (1545)

Orders
- Created cardinal: 22 December 1536 by Pope Paul III
- Rank: Cardinal-Priest

Personal details
- Born: 12 July 1477 Modena, Italy
- Died: 18 October 1547 (aged 70) Rome, Papal States

Jacopo Sadoleto (July 12, 1477 – October 18, 1547) was an Italian Catholic cardinal and counterreformer noted for his correspondence with and opposition to John Calvin.

== Life ==
He was born at Modena in 1477, the son of a noted jurist, he acquired reputation as a Neo-Latin poet, his best-known piece being one on the group of Laocoön. In Rome, he obtained the patronage of Cardinal Oliviero Carafa and adopted the ecclesiastical career. Pope Leo X chose him as his secretary along with Pietro Bembo, and in 1517 made him bishop of Carpentras (Provence.)

A faithful servant of the papacy in many negotiations under successive popes, especially as a peacemaker, his major aim was to win back the Protestants by peaceful persuasion and by putting Catholic doctrine in a conciliatory form. Sadoleto saw little of his diocese until the death of his master in 1522. Pope Clement VII recalled him to Rome a year later. Leaving Rome a few months before it was sacked, he diligently ruled his diocese, where he was greatly loved. Pope Paul III recalled him once more and made cardinal in 1536, given the titular church of San Callisto.

In 1539 Cardinal Sadoleto wrote to the people of Geneva, urging them to return to the Catholic faith. John Calvin had been asked to leave Geneva the previous year, and was living in Strasbourg, but the Genevans still asked Calvin to write a response to Sadoleto, which he did.

In 1541, Sadoleto engaged with the Vaudois (Waldensians) in his dioscese after the Parlement of Provence issued the "Arrêt de Mérindol". He found that "it seems to me, that there are many words in [your Articles], which might well be changed without prejudice to your confession," and their anti-clerical rhetoric could be toned down, but that otherwise the allegations of violent heresy made against them could not be sustained. This stalled the effort at persecution until 1545, when the French king finally ordered what became the Mérindol massacre.

Sadoleto died in Rome in 1547, aged 70.

== Works ==
Sadoleto's collected works appeared at Mainz in 1607, and include, besides his theological-ironical pieces, a collection of Epistles, a treatise on education (first published in 1533), and the Phaedrus, a defence of philosophy, written in 1538. The best collection is that published at Verona (1737–1738); it includes the life by Fiordibello.

- Sadoleto, Jacopo (1760). Epistolae quotquot extant proprio nomine scripta (in Latin). Vol. Pars prima. Roma: Generoso Salomoni.
- Sadoleto, Jacopo (1760). Epistolae quotquot extant proprio nomine scripta (in Latin). Vol. Pars secunda. Rome: Generoso Salamoni.
- Sadoleto, Jacopo (1764). Epistolae quotquot extant proprio nomine scripta (in Latin). Vol. Pars tertia. Rome: Generoso Salomoni.
- Sadoleto, Jacopo (1759). Jacobi Sadoleti ... Epistolae Leonis VII, Clementis VII, Pauli III nomine scriptae (in Latin). Roma: excudebat Generosus Salomonis.
- Pietro Balan, ed. (1884). Monumenta reformationis lutheranae ex tabulariis secretioribus S. sedis, 1521-1525 (in Latin). Ratisbon: sumptibus F. Pustet.
- Jacopo Sadoleto; Paolo Sadoleto (1871). Amadio Ronchini (ed.). Lettere del card. Iacopo Sadoleto e di Paolo suo nipote tratte dagli originali che si conservano a Parma nell'Archivio governativo (in Latin and Italian). Modena: Carlo Vincenzi.
- Sadoleto, Jacopo (1950). Antonio Altamura, tr. (ed.). Elogio della sapienza: De laudibus philosophiae (in Italian and Latin). Napoli: R. Pironti & figli.
- His chief work, a Commentary on Romans, meant as an antidote against the new Protestant doctrines, gave great offence at Rome and Paris: Sadoleto, Jacopo (1535). Iacobi Sadoleti... In Pauli Epistolam ad Romanos commentariorum libri tres (in Latin). Lyon: apud Sebastianum Gryphium.

== Bibliography ==
- Perrin, Charles (1847). De Jacobo Sadoleto, cardinali, episcopo Carpentoractensi, disquisitio historica, auctore Perrin (in Latin). Paris: Joubert.
- Pericaud, Antoine. Fragments biographiques sur Jacob Sadolet (Lyon, 1849)
- Joly, Aristide (1857). Étude sur J. Sadolet, 1477-1547. Caen: A. Hardel.
- Jean Calvin; Jacopo Sadoleto (1966). John C. Olin (ed.). A Reformation Debate: Sadoleto's Letter to the Genevans and Calvin's Reply. New York: Fordham Univ Press. ISBN 978-0-8232-1991-9.
- Douglas, Richard M. (2012). Jacopo Sadoleto, 1477-1547: Humanist and Reformer. Literary Licensing, LLC. ISBN 978-1-258-31736-2.
- This article incorporates text from a publication now in the public domain: Chisholm, Hugh, ed. (1911). "Sadoleto, Jacopo". Encyclopædia Britannica. Vol. 23 (11th ed.). Cambridge University Press. p. 994.
- Herbermann, Charles, ed. (1913). "Jacopo Sadoleto" . Catholic Encyclopedia. New York: Robert Appleton Company.
