= Jean-Pierre-Xavier Bidauld =

French painter

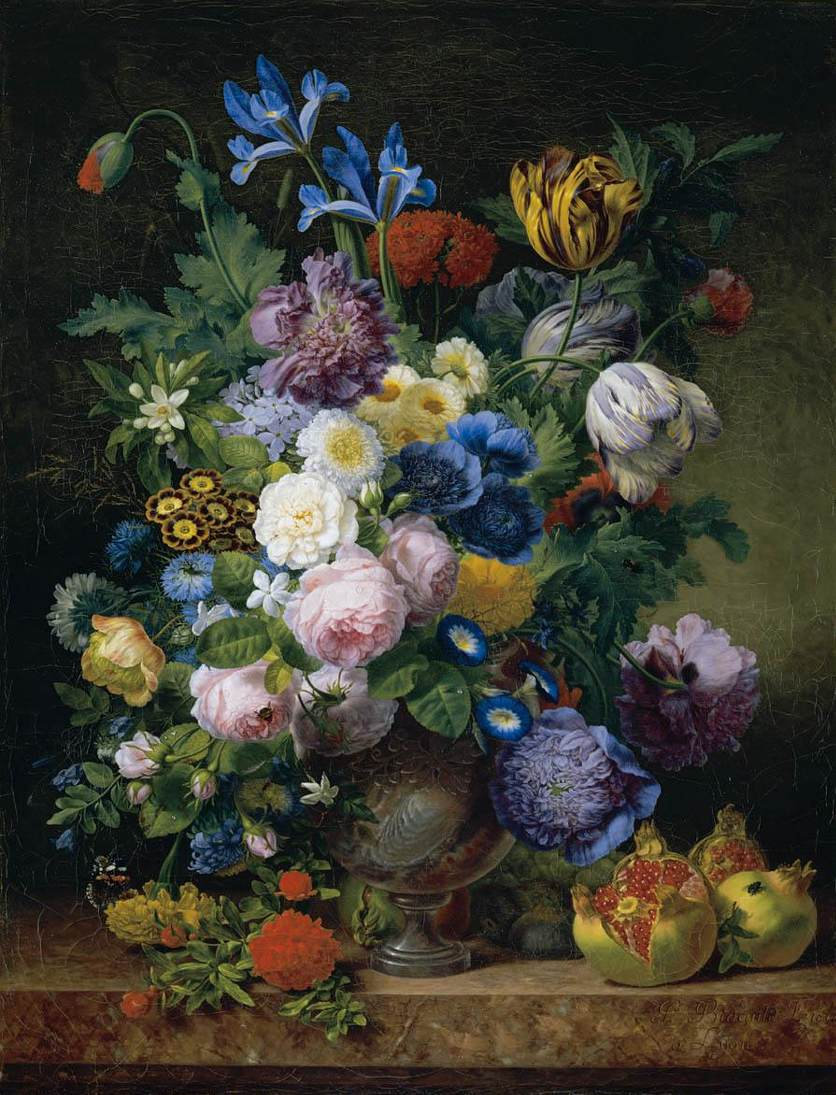
Jean-Pierre-Xavier Bidauld - Still-Life

Jean-Pierre-Xavier Bidauld (30 June 1743 – 1 November 1813) was a French painter, mainly of landscapes and still lifes. Born in Carpentras, he died in Lyon. He was the older brother, and first teacher, of Jean-Joseph-Xavier Bidauld; he was also the father-in-law of Jean-Baptiste Guimet and grandfather of Émile Étienne Guimet.
