= Pierre Autin-Grenier =

French writer

- Born: 4 April 1947; Lyon, France
- Died: 12 April 2014 (aged 67); Lyon, France
- Occupation: Writer

Pierre Autin-Grenier (French: [otɛ̃ gʁənje]; 4 April 1947 – 12 April 2014) was a French author. The catalogue of the Bibliothèque nationale de France gives his date of birth as 1947, though later dates ranging through to 1953 are quoted on various web pages including at least one contributed by the author. All sources agree, however, that he was born in Lyon, France, and the only day quoted is 4 April. He is associated with the movement sometimes referred to as the extrême contemporain, and his work is experimental rather than conventional. Radicalised by the events of May 1968 in France, his political position is close to anarchism and much of his writing is anti-capitalist and anti-bourgeois. His recent work, Friterie-bar Brunetti, is a collection of pieces about the habitués of the former Lyons bar of that name, with an undercurrent of opposition to the multinational chain cafés that are replacing such indigenous establishments, and the increasing atmosphere of regulation that undermines their atmosphere.

Autin-Grenier writes mainly short pieces, some short stories, some prose poems, and many of the short narrative pieces referred to in French literature as Récits. He has also been involved in a roman collectif (13, Quai de la Pécheresse, 69000 Lyon), a complete novel whose 13 chapters were each contributed by a different author. He has regularly published collections of his short pieces, and three of his collections of récits (Je ne suis pas un héros, Toute une vie bien ratée and L'éternité est inutile) form a kind of trilogy, under the collective title Une histoire. Because much of his work consists of short pieces, it is suitable for publication on the internet and several examples can be found online. As of 2007 his work has not appeared in English.

Autin-Grenier died in Lyon on 12 April 2014.

== Bibliography ==
(incomplete)

- Jours anciens (L'Arbre, 1980)
- Histoires secrètes (L.-O.Four, 1982 / La Dragonne, 2000)
- L'ange au gilet rouge (Syros, 1990 / Gallimard-L'Arpenteur, 2007), short stories
- Chronique des faits (L'Arbre, 1992)
- Impressions de Lozère: La Margeride (Les Presses du Languedoc, 1992)
- Je ne suis pas un héros (Gallimard-L'Arpenteur, 1993 / Folio, 2003), récits
- Légende de Zakhor (L'Arbre à paroles, 1996 / Éditions en Forêt, 2002)
- Toute une vie bien ratée (Gallimard-L'Arpenteur, 1997 / Folio, 1999), récits
- 13, Quai de la Pécheresse, 69000 Lyon (1999), collective novel
- L'éternité est inutile (Gallimard-L'Arpenteur, 2002), récits
- Les radis bleus (Le Dé bleu, 1991/ Gallimard-Folio, 2005)
- La-Haut (Éditions du Chemin de Fer, 2005)
- Friterie-bar Brunetti (Gallimard-L'Arpenteur, 2005)
- Un cri (Cadex, 2006)
- Élodie Cordou, la disparition (Éditions du Chemin de Fer, 2010)
- C'est tous les jours comme ça (Éditions Finitude, 2010)
