= Hôtel-Dieu of Carpentras =

Coordinates: 44°03′06″N 5°02′53″E

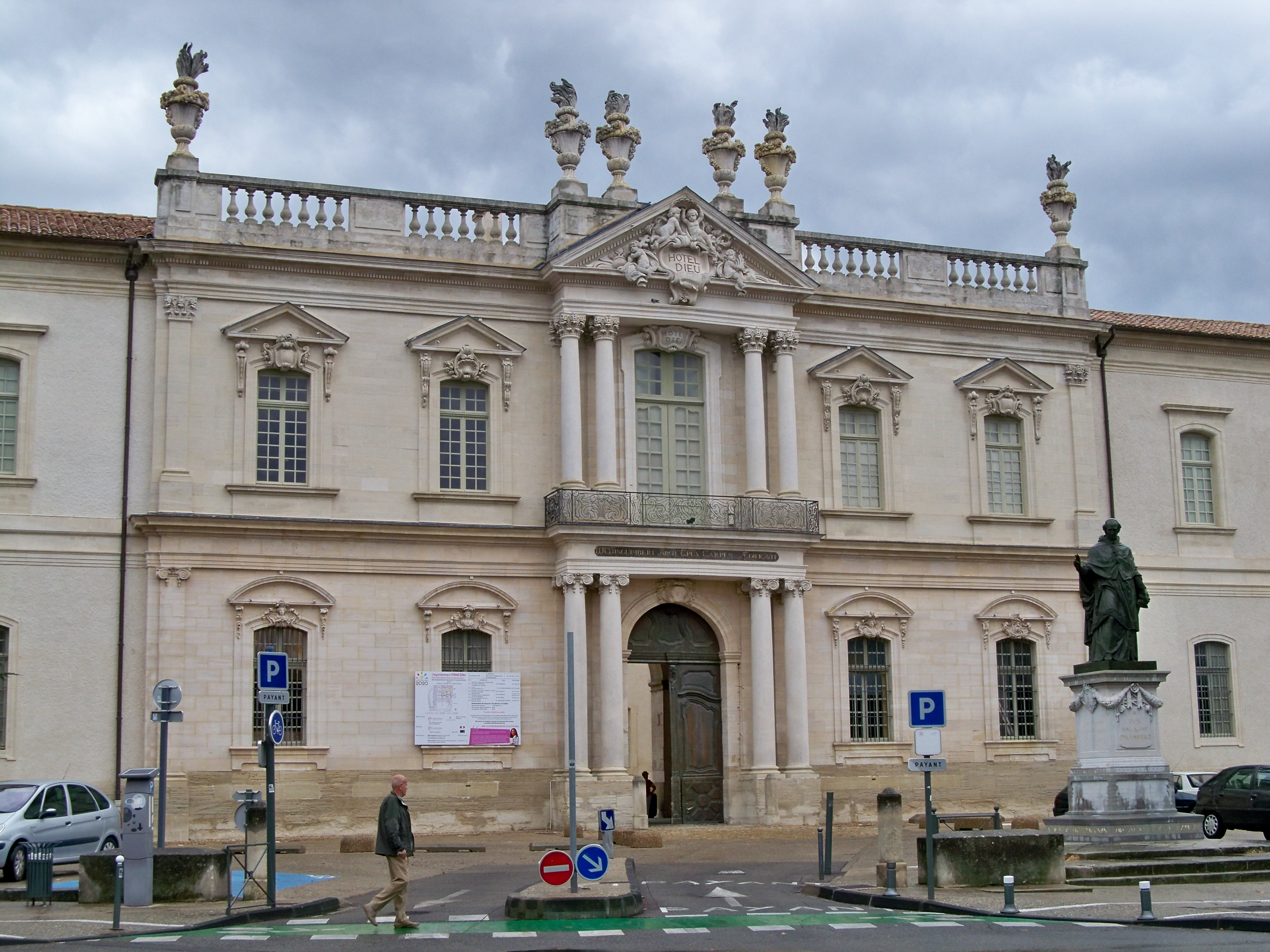

Geography
- Location: Carpentras, Provence, Vaucluse, France

Organisation
- Care system: Public

Services
- Emergency department: non

History
- Constructed: 1754
- Opened: 1750s
- Closed: 2002

Links
- Lists: Hospitals in France

The Hôtel-Dieu is a former hospital in Carpentras in Vaucluse in France.

== History ==
The building was commissioned by Joseph-Dominique d'Inguimbert for use as a hospital and was built between 1750 and 1760. After the hospital closed in the early 21st century, refurbishment works to accommodate the Bibliothèque Inguimbertine were initiated, and completed in April 2024.
