= Jean-François Delmas (palaeographer) =

French librarian

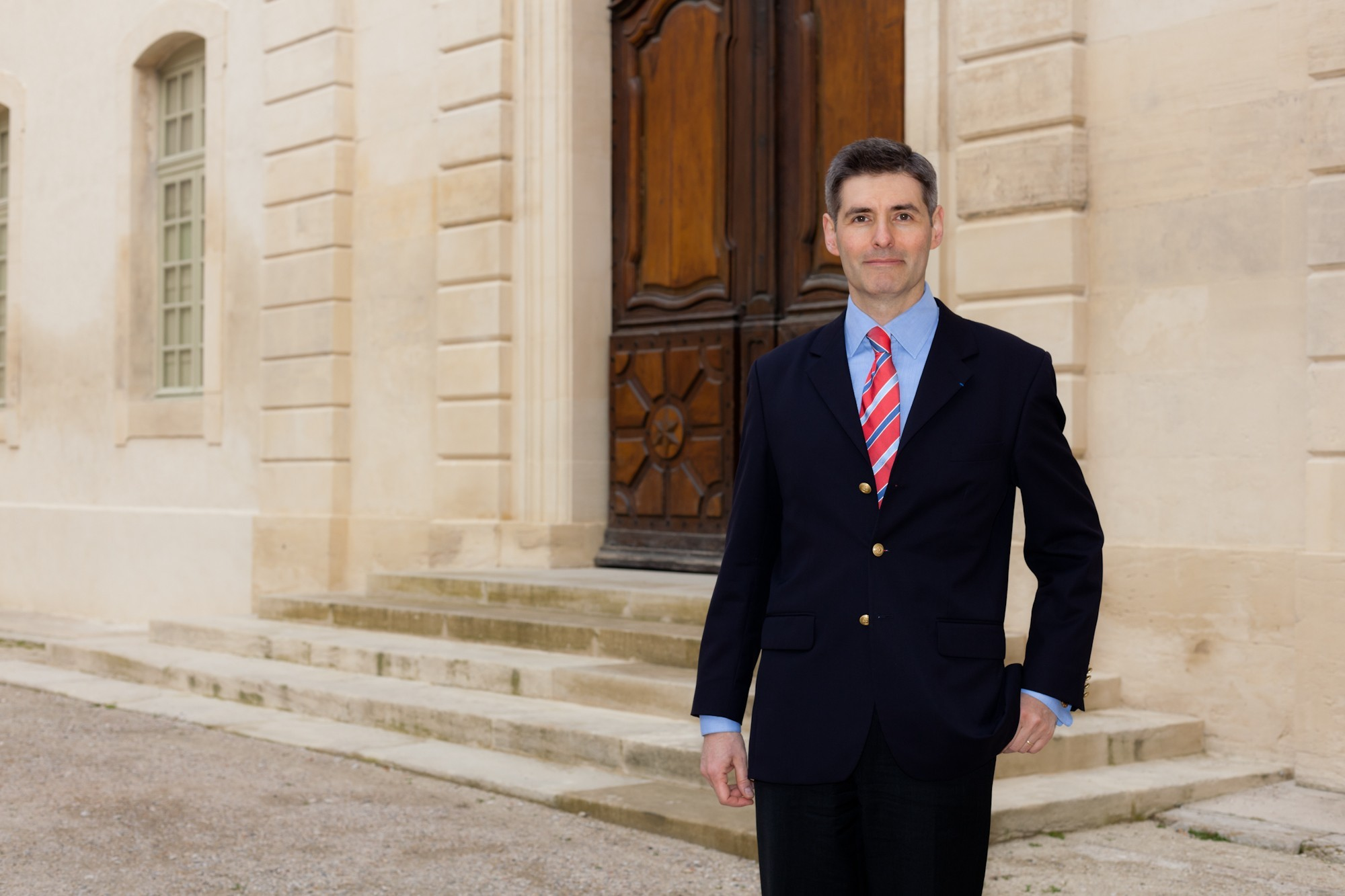
At l'Hôtel-Dieu of Carpentras

Jean-François Delmas (born 21 July 1964) is a French librarian. He is chief curator of the Bibliothèque Inguimbertine and the musées de Carpentras.

== Career ==
He is a graduate in art history and archaeology at the University of Paris-Sorbonne (Paris IV), and also holds a specialized master's degree of ESCP Europe.

== Works ==
- Jean-François Delmas (2008). L'Inguimbertine: maison des muses. Paris: Éditions Nicolas Chaudun. ISBN 978-2-35039-038-3. ISBN 2-35039-038-1.
