= Ancient Diocese of Carpentras =

Former diocese of the Roman Catholic Church in Provence

Coordinates: 44.05°N 5.05°E

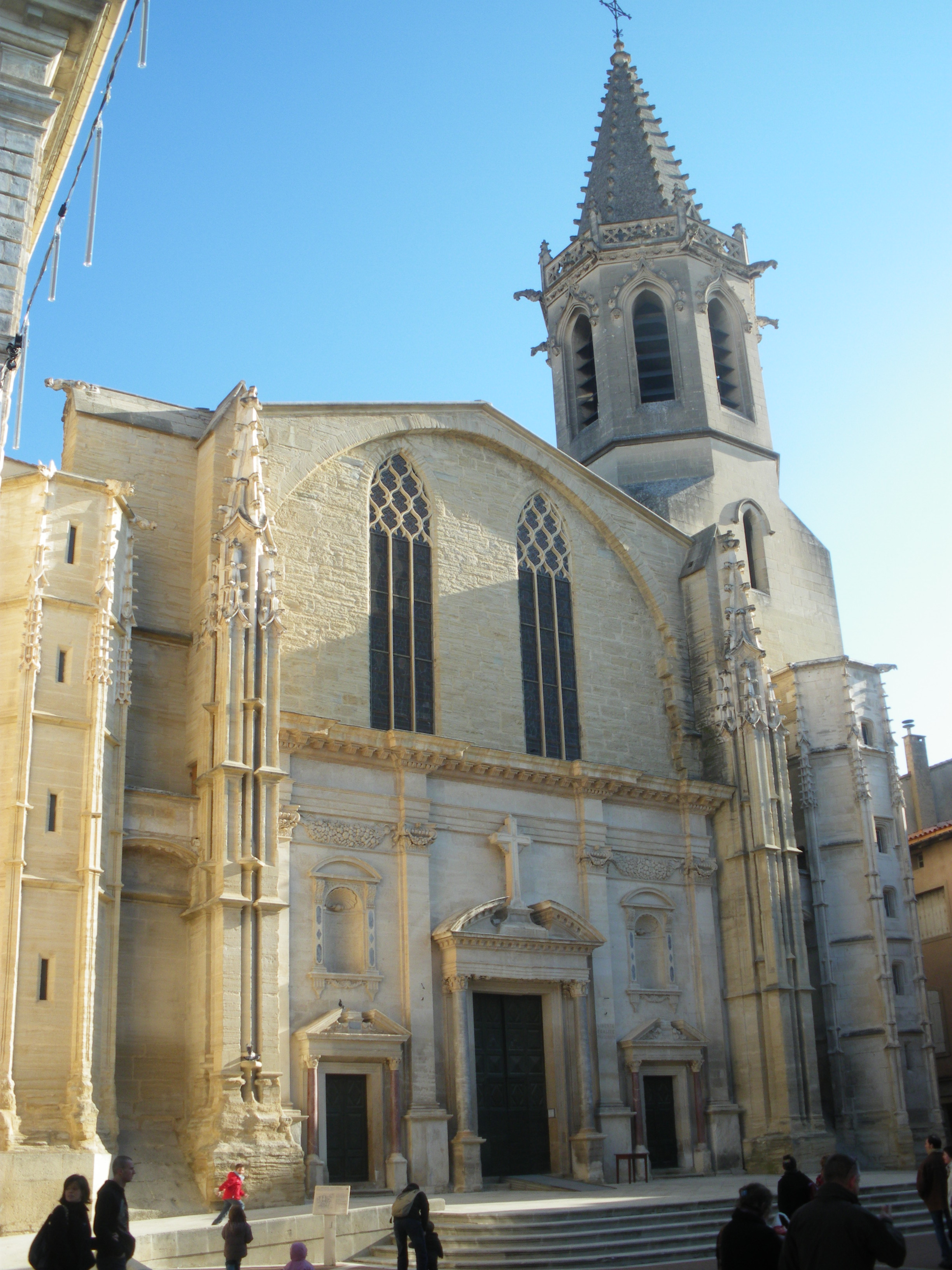
Former Cathedral of Saint Siffrein, Carpentras

Carpentras (Lat. dioecesis Carpentoratensis) was a diocese of the Roman Catholic Church in the Provence region (later part of France), from the later Roman Empire until 1801. It was part of the ecclesiastical province under the Metropolitan, the Archbishop of Arles. The bishop was a major figure in the Comtat Venaissin, and a member of the Estates of the Comtat. He was a direct appointee of the pope.

== History ==
The first historically documented bishop of Carpentras is Constantianus, who was represented at the Council of Riez in 439, of Orange in 441, and of Vaison in 442. Carpentras was a suffragan see of Arles from 450 to 1475, when it became a suffragan of Avignon.

Bishop Siffredus (Sigefridus) (c. 530–540) became the patron saint of Carpentras.

Later 6th and 7th centuries the bishops called themselves bishops of Venasque, with the exception of Boethius, who at Valence in 584 signed the acts of the council as Bishop of Carpentras. This suggests that, after Carpentras had fallen into ruin, the bishops lived in nearby Venasque. Carpentras is not mentioned in the context of the occupation of Provence by the Saracens (Arabs) in the ninth century or the depredations of the Northmen or of the Hungarians (924) in the tenth, which may be explained by its depopulation. The bishops of Carpentras are still speaking of the "See of Carpentras or Venasque" in the late tenth century.

=== The Jews of Carpentras: the Carrière ===
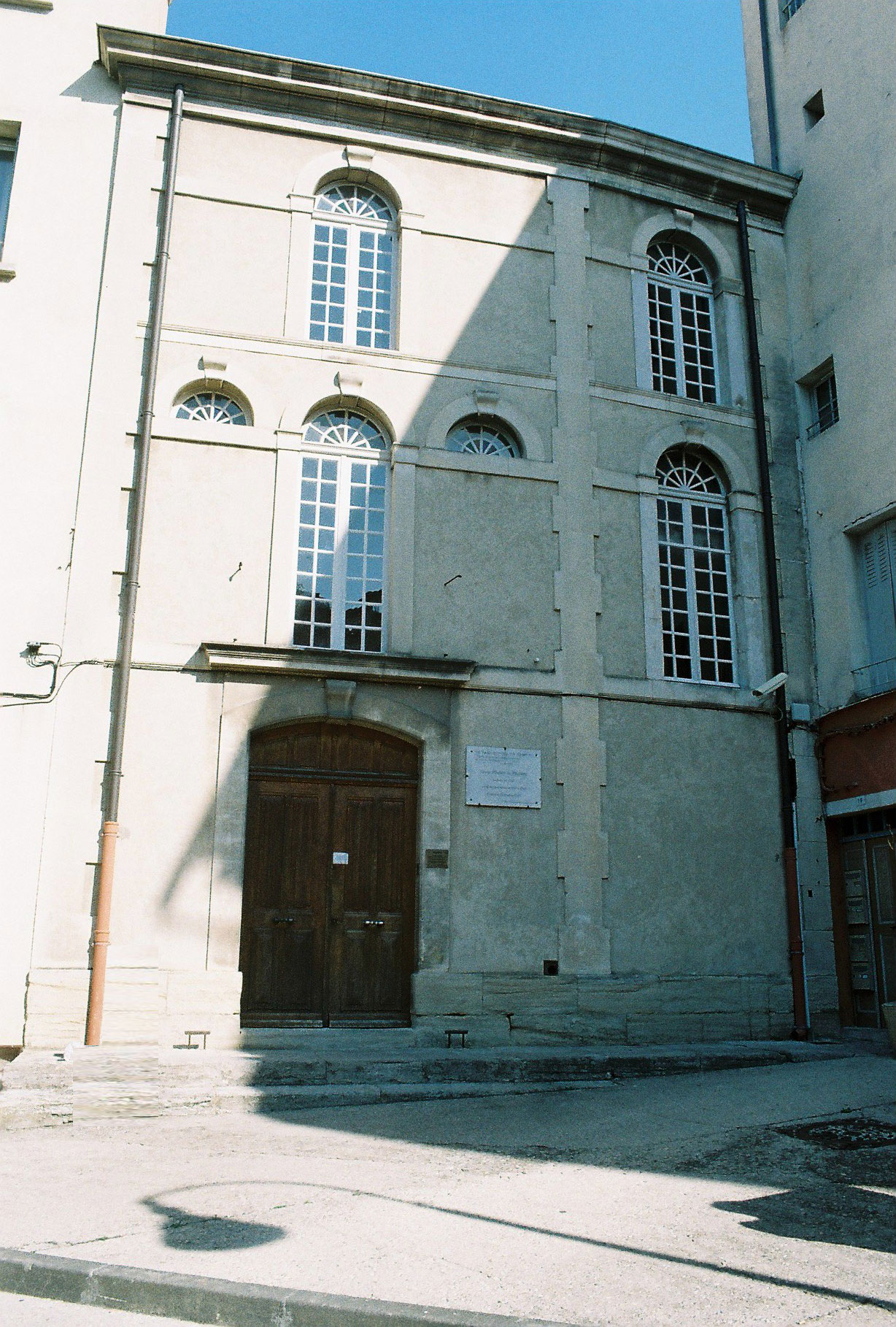
The Synagogue of Carpentras

Already by the beginning of the sixth century, there were significant numbers of Jews in the Midi. The bishops, who met at Agde in 507, and those who met at Epaona in 517, considered it necessary to make canons concerning fraternization with Jews even more stringent. One of these was Bishop Julianus of Carpentras. It was already forbidden for clerics to dine with Jews, but the prohibition was also extended to laymen. The earliest reference to a Jewish community in Carpentras is found in a set of community statutes, approved by several prominent rabbis in France, including the Rabbi of Carpentras, who may have been Jacob Tam. These belong to the first half of the twelfth century. At the beginning of the thirteenth century the Jews were expelled from Carpentras, but they returned in 1263. Apparently they were able to reach an accommodation with Bishop Raimundus de Barjols, who unfortunately died in February 1275.

Alphonse, Count of Poitiers, who ruled Provence in the name of his wife Joan of Toulouse, from 1249 until his death in 1271, was a vigorous persecutor of the Jews. In 1269 he issued an order for a general persecution of the Jews in his domains. In his Last Will and Testament, he left the Comtat Venaissin to the papacy, and though the rest of his Will was quashed, that one provision was allowed. In 1274, therefore, Pope Gregory X became the ruler of the Comtat, and in 1275 a new bishop of Carpentras was appointed, following the death of Bishop de Barjols. The political climate had changed. On 19 July 1275, the Papal Chamberlain and Provost of Marseille, Berenguer de Séguret, was appointed sole judge in cases concerning the Jews, to the exclusion of all other magistrates. On 28 February 1276, shortly after the Comtat Venaissin became the property of the popes, the Jews of Carpentras entered into an agreement with the Bishop of Carpentras, Pierre Rostaing, in which they agreed to become his vassals in exchange for his protection. They agreed as well to pay to him and his successors a series of specified taxes, but the Bishop agreed not to impose any other additional taxes on them, to guard their property, and to protect them from violence and injustice. The document was signed by sixty-four heads of families. Carpentras thus became, along with Avignon, Cavaillon, and L'Isle-sur-Sorgue, one of the recognized cities of refuge from antisemitic persecution in the Comtat Venaissin.

In 1320, a different Pope, John XXII (Jacques Duèse), agreed to defend the Jews of the Comtat from the murderous onslaught of the marauding bands of antisemitic shepherds, the Pastoureaux. Papal protection was not, however, without a price. In a bull of 12 April 1320 that same pope revoked the agreement between the bishops of Carpentras and their Jewish community, as he took the temporal power over Carpentras which had belonged to the bishops. The Pope was now the overlord of the Jews. And in 1322 he expelled the Jews and turned their synagogue into a church dedicated to the Virgin Mary. This situation lasted for twenty years, until a new Pope, Clement VI revoked John XXII's expulsion order, and granted permission in 1343 for the rebuilding of the synagogue of Carpentras. The synagogue was completed in 1367, and rebuilt in 1741; it was repaired in 1784 and 1899. In 1403 Pope Benedict XIII claimed all of the taxes which the Jews had formerly paid to the bishops. Pope Clement VII confirmed their privileges in 1524, and Pope Paul III revoked them in 1539. By virtue of a bull of 26 February 1569, Pope Pius V expelled the Jews from Italian and French territory, which was immediately followed by an order of 3 August 1570 from the Legate of Avignon for them to leave by October. The Rector of the Comtat, however, permitted some of them to remain, and they eventually restored their numbers. The French Revolution brought about their complete emancipation, and after the annexation of the Comtat Venaissin in 1793 they became French citizens.

=== Avignon Popes and Carpentras ===
In March 1313, at the beginning of the Avignon Papacy, Pope Clement V took up residence, with the Roman Curia, in Carpentras, where he stayed until April 1314; but, finding the city inconvenient, he departed for his home in Gascony, where he expected to recover his health, but died shortly thereafter. The popes resided in the Episcopal Palace in Carpentras. The comings and goings of the Papal Curia can be followed by noting the places at which their documents were written and signed.

Clement V was responsible for the building of the aqueduct of Carpentras. Its pipes were made of lead.

Following the death of Pope Clement V, and once the mourning for the deceased pope was ended, the Conclave met in the Episcopal Palace at Carpentras. It began around 1 May 1314. The twenty-three cardinals in the Conclave proceeded at a leisurely pace, though without coming to an agreement on the election, until the Feast of S. Mary Magdalen on Monday, 22 July 1314. The Italian cardinals were supporting Guillaume de Mandagot of Lodève, Bishop of Palestrina, who was a Frenchman and a subject of Philip IV of France. The Gascon cardinals, however, who had been appointed by Clement, and were not French subjects, refused to agree. On 22 July rioting broke out among the entourages of various cardinals, and some Gascons (it is claimed) burned down the palace and much of the city. The cardinals scattered, the Italian ones reassembling at Valence and complaining loudly about the Gascons and demanding that the papal Court return to Rome where a proper Conclave could be held. It was not until 28 June 1316, nearly two years later, that the Cardinals reassembled, this time at Lyon, and on 7 August elected Cardinal Jacques Duèse, who became John XXII.

The Comtat Venaissin had been papal property since 1274, a legacy of Alphonse, Count of Poitiers, younger brother of Louis IX of France. The capital, which gave the county its name, had been at Venasque, but in 1320 Pope John XXII transferred the capital to Carpentras. Two years later he engaged in an exchange of properties and powers with the Bishop, making the Pope the temporal lord of Carpentras as well as the Comtat.

In 1410 the Consuls of Carpentras received a request from the Consuls of Avignon to borrow Carpentras' heavy artillery and other war machines. In the Great Western Schism, the French had decided to repudiate Benedict XIII of the Avignon Obedience, who had been deposed by the Council of Pisa. They had accepted Alexander V, who had just been elected by the Cardinals who were at the Council of Pisa in June 1409. The leaders of Avignon had besieged the Catalans and Aragonese, led by Rodrigo de Luna, who were holding the Papal Palace for Benedict XIII. With the permission of Cardinal Pierre de Thury, the new Legate of Avignon and Vicar in the Comtat of Pope Alexander V, soldiers were enrolled at Carpentras and sent to Avignon. It was not until the end of 1411 that the supporters of Benedict XIII surrendered and departed.

=== Cathedral of Carpentras ===
The cathedral of Carpentras was the Church of St. Siffrein, dedicated to Saint Peter and Saint Siffrein. The present church, according to E. Andreoli, is the fifth on the site. The first was built in the sixth century; the second in the Carolingian period; the third in the tenth century; and the fourth at the beginning of the thirteenth century, the work of Bishop Geoffroy de Garosse. The fifth is of the fifteenth century, begun under the patronage of the Avignon pope, Benedict XIII. The first stone was laid in a solemn ceremony on 22 February 1404, the Feast of Saint Peter's Chair, presided over by Archbishop Artaud of Arles, in the name of Pope Benedict XIII. The commemorative inscription survives, on the south wall of the cathedral. The consecration took place in 1515.

The Cathedral possesses an especially sacred relic, called the Saint-Clou, the remains of one of the nails that was used on Christ at the Crucifixion. According to the legend retailed by Gregory of Tours, two of the nails were given by Saint Helena to her son Constantine the Great, who wore one on his helmet and had the other fashioned into a bit for his horse's mouth (or into a bridle ornament). One legend says that Constantine gave the Saint-Clou to Bishop Siffrein's father, involving an anachronism of major proportions. Its image is found in various places in the cathedral and on various medieval seals.

The Chapter of the cathedral was founded in 982 by Bishop Ayrardus, with sixteen Canons. In 1241 Bishop Guillelmus Beroaldi (Beroardus) had to reduce the number of Canons to twelve for financial reasons. Two of the twelve were dignities (dignités, not 'dignitaries'): the Provost and the Archdeacon (founded in 1306). There was also a Capiscol and a Sacristan, and two of the Canons served as Theologian (founded in 1602) and Penitentiary (founded in 1588). The Chapter was obliged, for sacred services, to maintain two curés of the cathedral, a Master of the chapel, four choirboys and four mensionarii.

==== Saint-Jean-du-Bourg ====
There was a second church of importance in Carpentras, the church of Saint-Jean-du-Bourg, situated inside the fortifications, on the east side of the city. It was governed, like the cathedral, by a Chapter of Canons, six in number, the Sacristan and five prebendary Canons. The Canons followed the Rule of Notre-Dame du Grès of the Order of Saint-Ruf. The Canons had their monastery outside the city, however, and the church there was dedicated to the Virgin Mary.

=== Development of Carpentras ===
Carpentras appears to have escaped completely the ravages of the Black Death (bubonic plague) in 1348–1353. It did not suffer an invasion until 1395, and then was free of trouble until 1468.

The Dominican friar, Vincent Ferrer, lived and preached in Carpentras from 22 November 1399 to 12 February 1400.

On his death in November 1452, Bishop Georges d'Ornas ordered in his Will that his library be sold, and the proceeds contributed to the building of the new cathedral. A part of the library was sold, but then a number of people, led by the new bishop Michel Anglici and by Roger de Foix the Rector of the Comtat Venaissin, intervened, and determined to preserve the remaining books for the education and training of clerics and of the citizens and inhabitants of Carpentras. To make the books available to the public, those which pertained to liturgy and ecclesiastical matters were chained up in the Choir of the cathedral; the others were placed by Bishop Anglici in one of the chapels, the most important on chains and the rest in cupboards.

==== Protestantism ====
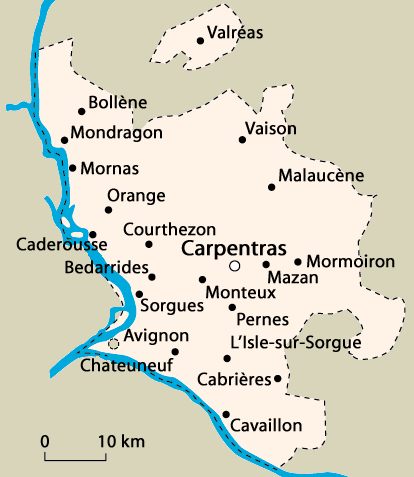

The first Protestant to be found in Carpentras was Claude Baduel, a humanist scholar and a Lutheran, who had been a teacher at the collège of arts in Nîmes. He was an acquaintance of Cardinal Jacopo Sadoleto. In 1544, just as Sadoleto and the Consuls of Carpentras were engaged in a search for a new principal for their collège, Baduel make known his desire to seek a new field for his work outside Nîmes. His application for the position at Carpentras took the form of an elegantly written Latin treatise on education of the youth, and addressed to Cardinal Sadoleto. He took up the position in September 1544, but in April 1545, the notorious Massacre of Mérindol in the Vaucluse, some forty miles from Carpentras, occurred. The royally authorized massacre of Waldensians (Vaudois) eventually involved more than twenty-two towns and villages including Cabrières, and Baduel decided in December to return to his former position in Nîmes. The Lutheran movement in the Comtat collapsed.

In 1562, at the beginning of the Wars of Religion in France, the Huguenot general, the Baron des Adrets, made his descent on the Venaissin from the Dauphiné, where he had been very successful. He took Caderousse, Orange, Courthézon, Bédarrides, and Chateauneuf-du-Pape, all of whose inhabitants had taken flight. He then took Sarrians and Sorgues, intending to use them as a base to attack Avignon, but when he learned that Avignon was fortified and prepared for strong resistance, he aimed instead for Carpentras. He arrived on 28 July 1562, encamped next to the aqueduct, began to lay out siege works. The inhabitants of Carpentras cut their aqueduct to keep Adrets from a water supply, and from time to time threw red soil and foul matter into the Auzon River. In the meantime Fabrice Serbelloni, the nephew of Pope Pius IV and General of the papal troops, arrived in the neighborhood, and the Huguenots were forced to retire on 3 and 4 August. Next year, after the Peace of Amboise on 25 March 1563, the Huguenot forces returned, took Monteux, and advanced to Carpentras, but they were driven away with considerable losses.

==== Other institutions ====
A convent of Dominican friars was founded in Carpentras in 1312. Louis de Vervins, Archbishop of Narbonne (1600–1628), had been a monk in this convent, and had become its Prior; he was a generous benefactor. There was also a convent of Observant Franciscans, one of Capuchins, one of Discalced Carmelites. Of the religious orders for women, there were five convents in Carpentras: the abbey of the Cistercians of Saint Mary Magdeleine and of Saint Bernard, the monastery of the Discalced Carmelites, the Convent of the Visitation, the house of refuge called Notre-Dame de Sainte Garde, and the convent called L'Intérieur de Marie. These were all liquidated by order of the French National Constituent Assembly in 1790.

A seminary was established for the diocese in 1585, in accordance with the decrees of the Council of Trent, by Bishop Jacques Sacrati. Administration and staffing of the seminary was turned over to the Jesuits by Bishop Lorenzo Buti (1691–1710). The Jesuits also staffed the Collège de Carpentras, founded in 1607, where the humanities and philosophy were taught.

A hospital for the sick already existed in Carpentras in the time when the Counts of Toulouse owned the Comtat Venaissin. Bishop Joseph-Dominique d'Inguimbert (1735 – 1757) was responsible for the building of the new hospital in Carpentras, beginning in 1750. The hospital was famous for the magnificence of its buildings and for the size of its endowment, one of the largest in France. This hospices became the major depository of abandoned children in the department, due in part to the convenience offered by the regular market at Carpentras. In January 1807 the number of children at Carpentras was 107.

=== End of the diocese ===
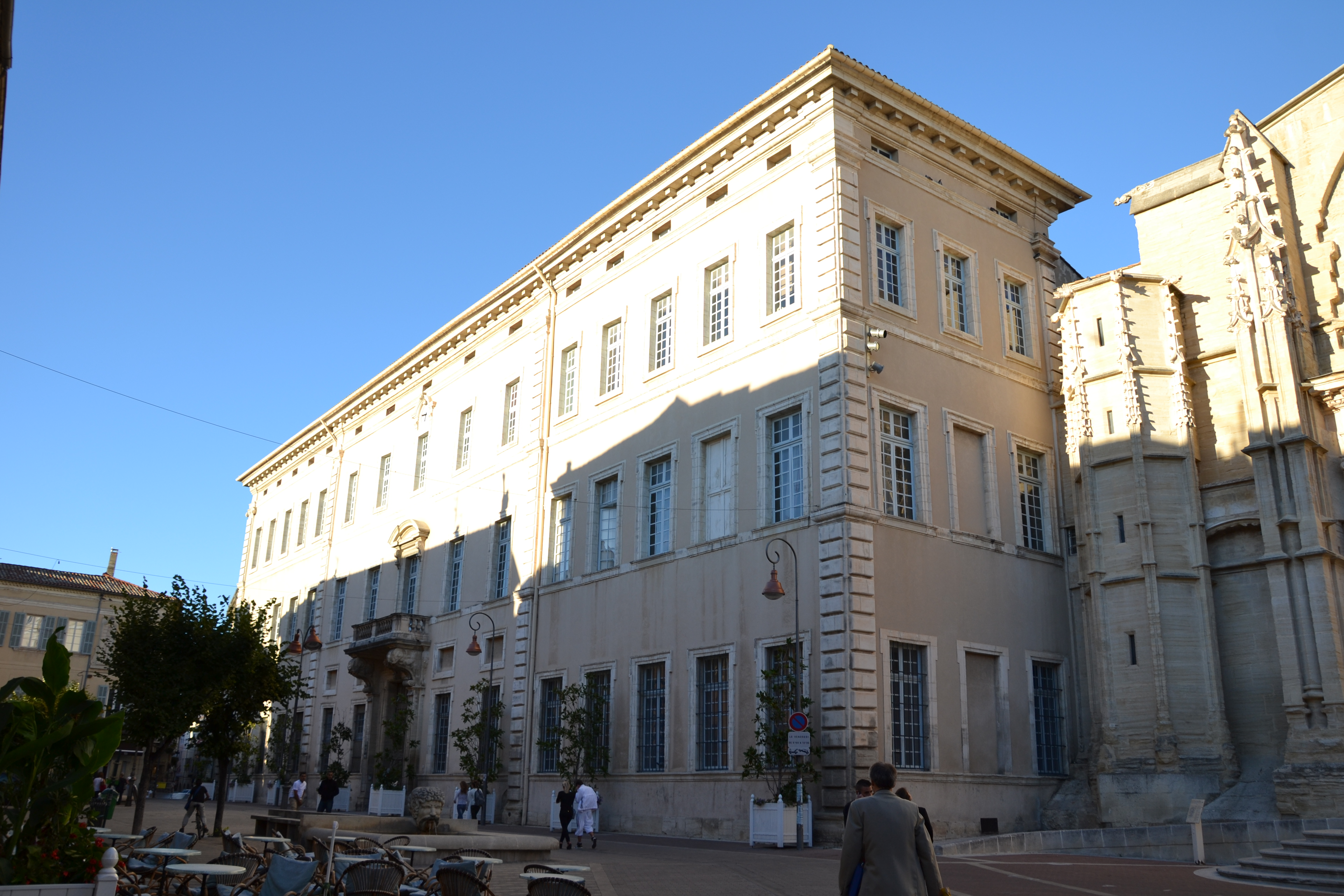
Former episcopal palace, Palais de Justice

In 1790 the National Constituent Assembly decided to bring the French church under the control of the State. Civil government of the provinces was to be reorganized into new units called 'départements', originally intended to be 83 or 84 in number. The dioceses of the Roman Catholic Church were to be reduced in number, to coincide as much as possible with the new departments. Since there were more than 130 bishoprics at the time of the Revolution, more than fifty dioceses needed to be suppressed and their territories consolidated. Carpentras was one of those which were suppressed, by the French government, not by the canonical authority of the papacy. Its territory was assigned by the government to the new "Diocese of Vaucluse", with its headquarters at Avignon. All monasteries, convents and religious orders in France were dissolved, and their members were released from their vows by order of the National Constituent Assembly (which action was uncanonical); their property was confiscated "for the public good", and sold to pay the bills of the French government. Cathedral Chapters were also dissolved.

In accordance with the Concordat of 1801, Carpentras ceased to be a residential diocese on 29 November 1801, and its territory was canonically incorporated into that of the Diocese of Avignon by virtue of a papal bull. The former episcopal palace, which had been built by Cardinal Bichi in the 1640s, became the Palace of Justice and prison. The cloisters between the palace and the cathedral were demolished in 1829, though traces of the arches and vaulting can be seen on the north wall of the cathedral.

In 1877, the title of bishop of Carpentras, along with those of other ancient sees, was added to that of the archbishops of Avignon and remained so until 2009. In January 2009 Pope Benedict XVI revived the title (though not the actual diocese) of Carpentras as a titular see. The current titular Bishop of Carpentras is Emmanuel Marie Anne Alain Gobilliard, Auxiliary Bishop of Lyon.

== Bishops ==
=== To 1100 ===
- (c. 439–c. 451) Constantianus
- (c. 517–c. 529) Julianus
- (c. 530– before 541) Siffredus (Siffrein)
- (c. 541– after 552) Clematius, Bishop of Carpentras and Venasque
- (c. 573) Tetradius
- (c. 584 – 604) Boethius
- (c. 614) Ambrosius
- (c. 650) Licerius

...

- (c. 788) Amatus

...

- (c. 948) Ayrardus

...

- (c. 992 – after 1 April 1013) Stephanus, Bishop of Venasque

...

- (c. 1040, 1044, 1056?) Franco
- (c.1056 – c. 1058) Julius

...

- (c. 1068) Guillelmus

...

=== From 1100 to 1500 ===
- (c. 1107 – c. 1120) Gaufredus
- (c. 1121 – 1142) Gaspardus
- (1142 – after 1165) Raimundus

? Guillaume de Risole

- ( ? – 1178) Petrus

? Innocent II
? Andreas

- (c. 1178 – c.1195) Raimbaudus
- (c. 1195 – c. 1211) Gaufridus
- (c. 1211 – c. 1218) Guillaume de Bordellis
- (c. 1218 – 1228) Isnardus
- (c. 1229 – 1230) Bertrandus
- (1230 – 1263) Guillelmus Beroaldi
- (1263 – 1275) Raimundus de Barjols
- (1275 – 1279) Pierre de Rostaing
- (1280 – ? ) Raimundus de Mazan
- (1294 – 1317) Berengarius de Mazan
- (1318 – c. 1331) Otho (Eudes)
- (1332 – 1347) Hugo (Hugues)
- (1347 – 1357) Guaffredus (Geoffroy)
- (1357 – 1371) Jean Roger
- (1371 – 1376) Guillaume l'Estrange
- (1376 – 1397) Pierre Laplotte (Laplon)
- (1397 – 1406) Pope Benedict XIII (Pedro de Luna)

(1397 – after August 1402) Jean Filheti (Administrator)

- (1406 – 1423) Cardinal Ludovico Fieschi (Administrator)
- (1424 – 1425) Jacques de Camplon
- (1426 – 1446) Sagax dei Conti
- (1446 – 1449) Guillaume Soibert
- (1449 – 1452) Georges d'Ornos
- (1452 – 1471) Michel Anglici
- (1471 – 1472) Giuliano della Rovere (Administrator) (future Pope Julius II)
- (1472 – 1481) Federico di Saluzzo (Administrator)
- (1483 – 1517) Pierre de Valletariis

=== From 1500 to 1800 ===
- (1517–1547) Jacopo Sadoleto
- (1547–1572) Paolo Sadoleto
- (1572–1593) Jacobus Sacrati
- (1593–1596) Francesco Sadoleto
- (1596–1615) Orazio Capponi
- (1616–1630) Cosimo de' Bardi
- (1630–1657) Cardinal Alessandro Bichi
- (1657–1661) Louis de Fortia

(1661–1665) Sede vacante

- (1665–1684) Gaspar Lascaris du Castellar
- (1687–1690) Cardinal Marcello Durazzo
- (1691–1710) Lorenzo Buti
- (1710–1735) Francesco Maria Abbati
- (1735–1757) Joseph-Dominique d'Inguimbert, O.Cist.
- (1757–1776) Giuseppe Vignoli
- (1776–1801) Giuseppe di Beni

== See also ==
- Carpentras
- Carpentras Cathedral
- Catholic Church in France
- List of Catholic dioceses in France
