= Comtat Venaissin =

Enclave of the Papal States within France

Comtat Venaissin: Comtat Venaissin (French); Comtat Venessin (Occitan); Pagus Vendascinus/Venuxini Comitatus (Latin)
- 1271–1791
- Flag of the Papal States Coat of arms of the Avignon Papacy
- Motto: Per lo Papa, per la nacion ("For the Pope, for the nation")
- Map of the Comtat Venaissin and Avignon (in blue) in the XVIII century

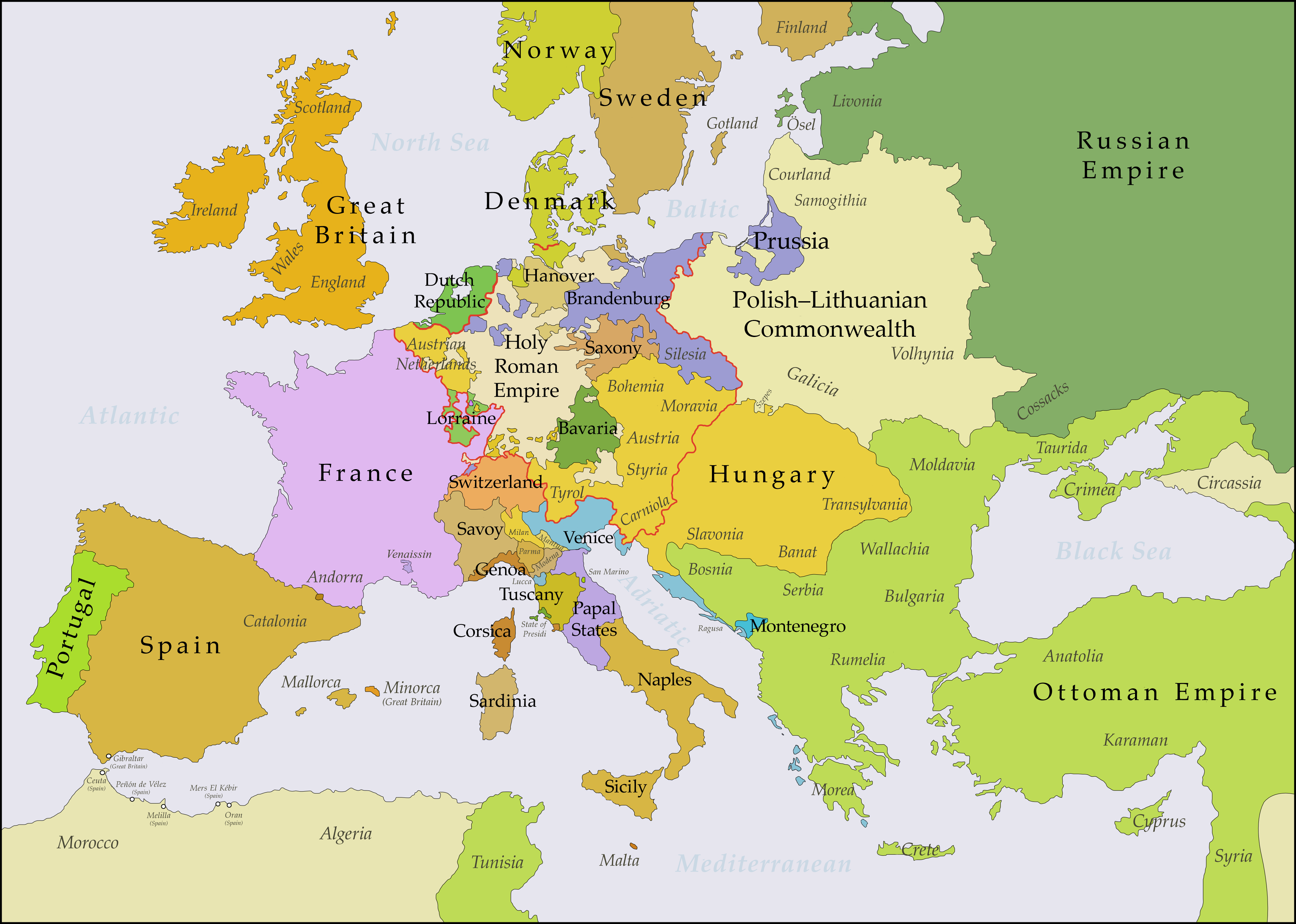
- Map of political borders in Europe between 1748 and 1766
- Status: Papal enclave
- Capital: Venasque (1274–1320); Carpentras (1320–1791); 44°5′N 5°0′E
- Common languages: Provençal Occitan; French; Latin
- Religion: Roman Catholicism
- Historical era: Middle Ages
  - Death of Alphonse, Count of Poitiers: 21 August 1271
  - Acquired by papacy: 1271
  - Annexed as a Papal state: 1274
  - Capital moved to Carpentras: 1320
  - Avignon purchased from Joanna, Countess of Provence: 1348
  - French occupation: 1663, 1668, 1768–1774
  - Incorporated into France by plebiscite: 14 September 1791
  - Treaty of Tolentino: 1797
- Currency: Roman scudo
| Preceded by | Succeeded by |
| County of Toulouse; Avignon Papacy | French First Republic |
- Today part of: France

The Comtat Venaissin (French pronunciation: [kɔ̃ta vənɛsɛ̃]; Occitan: lo Comtat Venaicin; 'County of Venaissin'), often called the Comtat for short, was a part of the Papal States from 1274 to 1791, in what is now the Provence-Alpes-Côte d'Azur region of Southern France.

The state was a separate independent enclave within the Kingdom of France but not part of it, comprising the area around the city of Avignon (itself always a separate comtat) roughly between the Rhône, the Durance and Mont Ventoux, and a small exclave located to the north around the town of Valréas purchased by Pope John XXII. The Comtat also bordered (and mostly surrounded) the Principality of Orange. The region is still known informally as the Comtat Venaissin, although this term no longer has any political significance.

== History ==
In 1096, the Comtat was part of the Margraviate of Provence that was inherited by Raymond IV, Count of Toulouse from William Bertrand of Provence. These lands in the Holy Roman Empire belonged to Joan, Countess of Toulouse, and her husband, Alphonse, Count of Poitiers. Alphonse bequeathed it to the Holy See on his death in 1271.

The Comtat became a Papal territory in 1274. The region was named after its former capital, Venasque, which was replaced as capital by Carpentras in 1320.

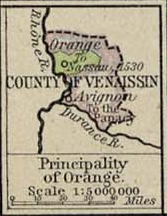
Map showing the Comtat and the Principality of Orange in 1547

Avignon was sold to the papacy by Joanna I, Queen of Naples and Countess of Provence, in 1348, whereupon the two comtats were joined to form a unified papal enclave geographically, though retaining their separate political identities.

The enclave's inhabitants did not pay taxes and were not subject to military service, making life in the Comtat considerably more attractive than under the French Crown. It became a haven for French Jews, who received better treatment under papal rule than in the rest of France. The Carpentras synagogue, built in the 14th century, is the oldest in France, and until the French Revolution preserved a distinctive Provençal Jewish tradition.

Successive French rulers sought to annex the region to France. It was invaded by French troops in 1663, 1668 and 1768–1774 during disputes between the Crown and the Church. It was also subjected to trade and customs restrictions during the reigns of Louis XIV and Louis XV.

Papal control continued until 1791, when an unauthorized plebiscite, under pressure from French revolutionaries, was held and the inhabitants voted for annexation by France. The process was facilitated by Pierre-Antoine Antonelle, then mayor of Arles. A few years later, the Vaucluse department was created based on Comtat Venaissin including the exclave of Valréas and a part of the Luberon for the southern half. The papacy did not recognise this formally until 1814.

=== Administration ===
Under the Counts of Toulouse, the chief officer of the Comtat Venaissin was the Seneschal.

From 1294 to 1791 the chief administrator of the Comtat Venaissin was the Rector, who was appointed directly by the Pope. Most of the incumbents were in fact prelates, either Archbishops or Bishops, and the Rector therefore had the right to wear a purple garb, similar to that of an Apostolic Chamberlain. His official residence was in Carpentras. He had no authority over Avignon, however, which was administered by a Cardinal Legate or a Vice-Legate, also appointed directly by the Pope. Gradually, however, the power of the Vice-Legate encroached on that of the Rector, until the Cardinal virtually held the position of a governor, and the Rector had the functions of a judge. In both cases their tenure was for a period of three years, renewable.

The Rector had the right to receive oaths of homage of all the papal 'vassals'. He also had the right to receive the oaths of bishops who held property by virtue of their office which was in feudal tenure from the pope. The Rector named the Notaries of the Comtat. He presided at the negotiation and payment of revenues of the Apostolic Chamber. His court was the Supreme Court of the Comtat Venaissin, and he had both criminal and civil jurisdiction of the first instance, and appellate jurisdiction from the courts of the regular judges of the three judicial circuits.

The Rector was seconded by a Vice-Rector, named the Lieutenant of the Rector, also a papal appointee. He had judicial powers similar to those of the Rector.

The administration of the Comtat was in the hands of the Estates of the Comtat, which consisted of the Élu (a nobleman), the Bishop of Carpentras, the Bishop of Cavaillon, the Bishop of Vaison, and eighteen representatives of the three judicial districts into which the Comtat was divided. The Estates held their meetings at Carpentras.

The Apostolic Camera (Treasury of the Holy Roman Church) had a permanent office in Carpentras, with full jurisdiction in all financial matters concerning the rights of the Holy See in the Comtat. This included the obligations of bishops and other ecclesiastical persons to the papacy.

== See also ==
- Papal States
- Papal Jews
