= Carpentras =

- Subprefecture and commune
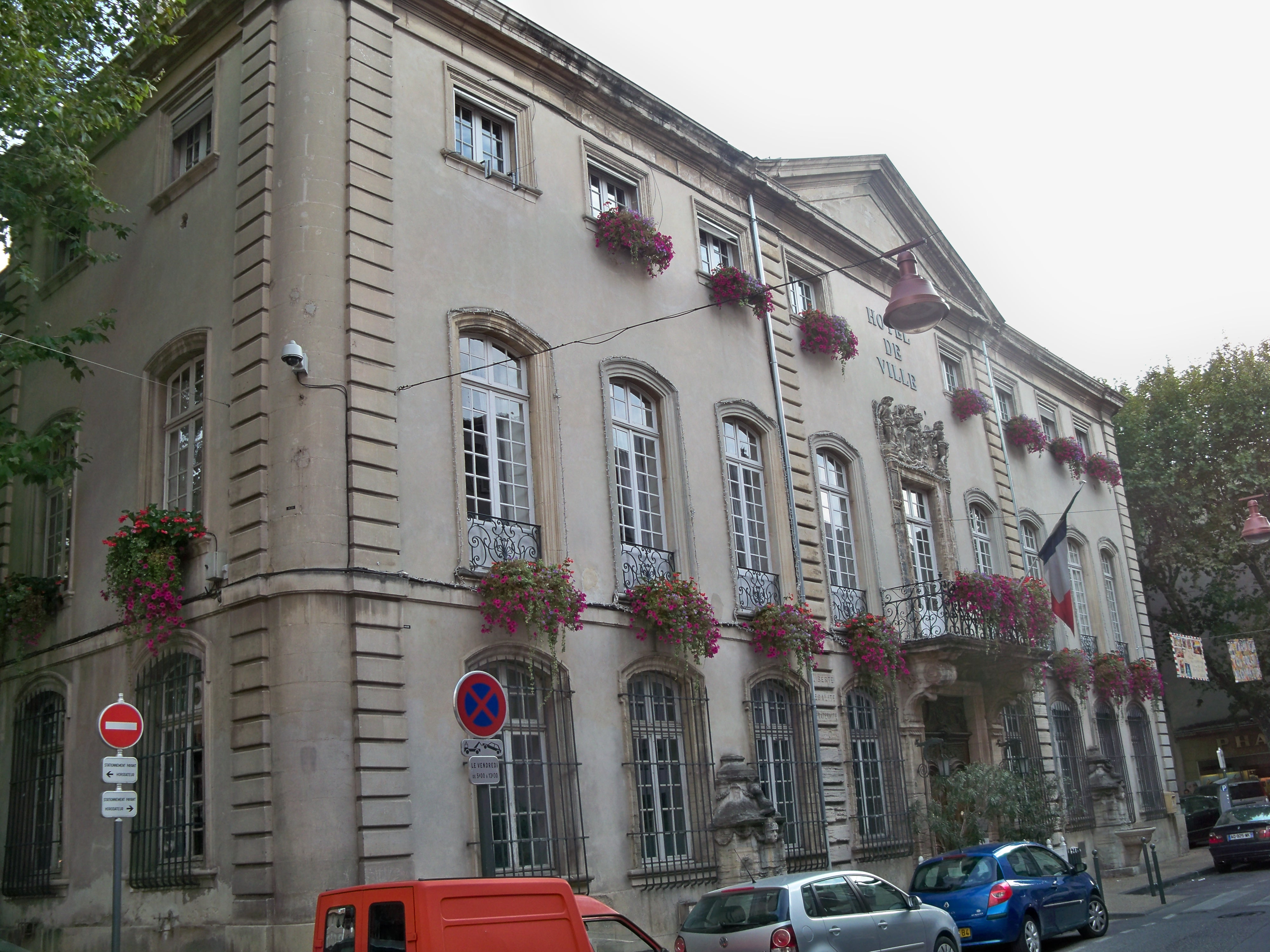
- The Hôtel de Ville

- Coat of arms
- Location of Carpentras
- Location within France Location within Provence-Alpes-Côte d'Azur
- Coordinates: 44°03′21″N 5°02′56″E
- Country: France
- Region: Provence-Alpes-Côte d'Azur
- Department: Vaucluse
- Arrondissement: Carpentras
- Canton: Carpentras
- Intercommunality: CA Ventoux-Comtat Venaissin

Government
  - Mayor (2020–2026): Serge Andrieu
- Area^{1}: 37.92 km^{2} (14.64 sq mi)
- Elevation: 95 m (312 ft)
- Highest elevation: 212 m (696 ft)
- Lowest elevation: 56 m (184 ft)
- Population (2023): 31,619
  - Density: 833.8/km^{2} (2,160/sq mi)
- Time zone: UTC+01:00 (CET)
  - Summer (DST): UTC+02:00 (CEST)
- INSEE/Postal code: 84031 /84200
- ^{1} French Land Register data, which excludes lakes, ponds, glaciers > 1 km^{2} (0.386 sq mi or 247 acres) and river estuaries.

Carpentras (French pronunciation: [kaʁpɑ̃tʁa], formerly [kaʁpɑ̃tʁas]; Provençal Occitan: Carpentràs in classical norm or Carpentras in Mistralian norm; Latin: Carpentoracte) is a commune in the Vaucluse department in the Provence-Alpes-Côte d'Azur region in southeastern France.

As capital of the Comtat Venaissin, it was frequently the residence of the Avignon popes; the Papal States retained possession of the Venaissin until the French Revolution. Nowadays, Carpentras is a commercial center for Comtat Venaissin and is famous for the black truffle markets held from winter to early spring.

Carpentras briefly held France's all-time high-temperature record, during the heatwave of June 2019.

== History ==
=== Classical antiquity ===
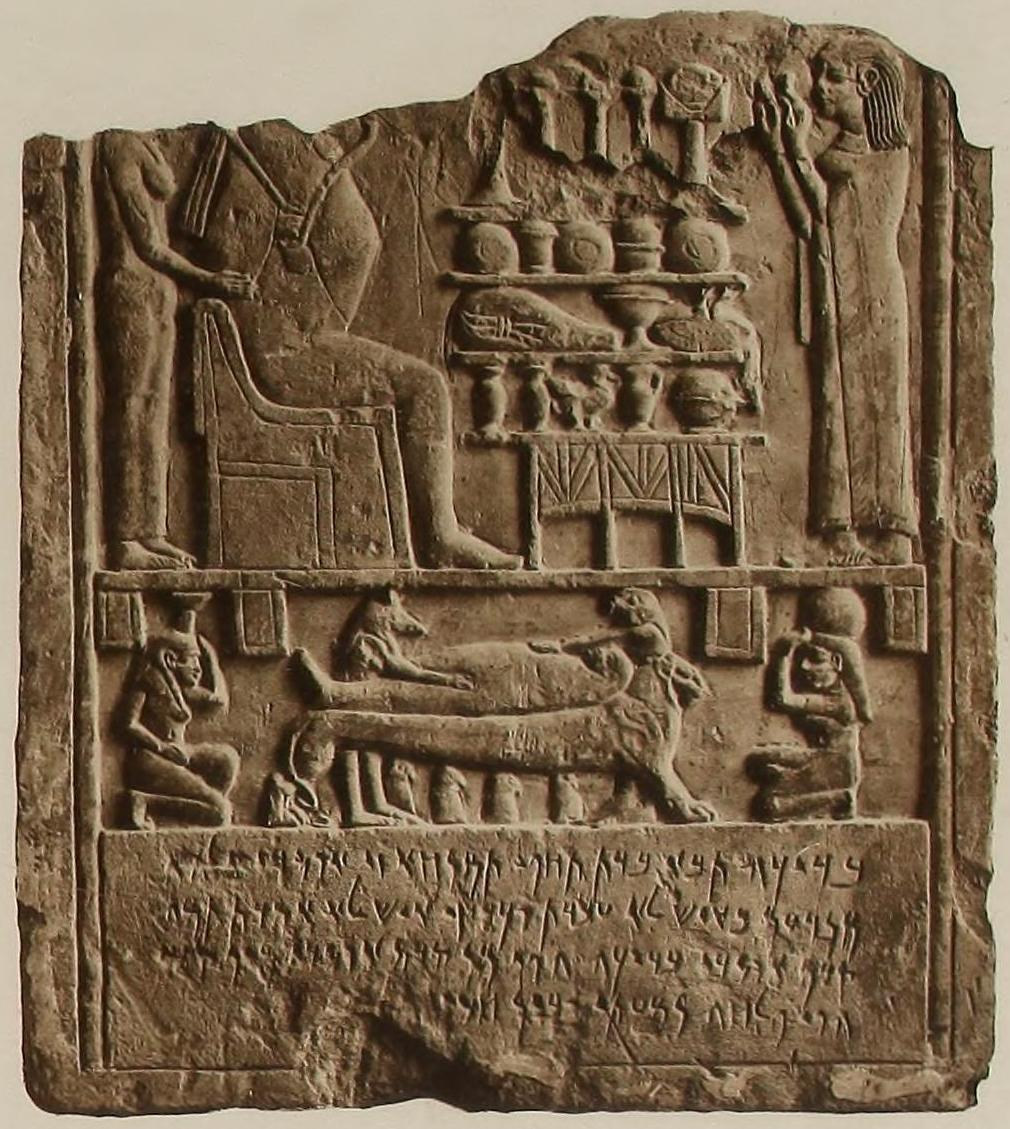
The Carpentras Stele, found in the town in 1704, was the first Northwest Semitic (i.e. Canaanite or Aramaic) inscription published anywhere in modern times.

Carpentras was a commercial site used by Greek merchants in ancient times, and known to Romans at first as Carpentoracte Meminorum, mentioned by Pliny, then renamed Forum Neronis ("Forum of Nero"); the city retains a Roman triumphal arch, that has been enclosed by the bishops' palace, rebuilt in 1640, now a law court, and a machicolated city gate, the Porte d'Orange.

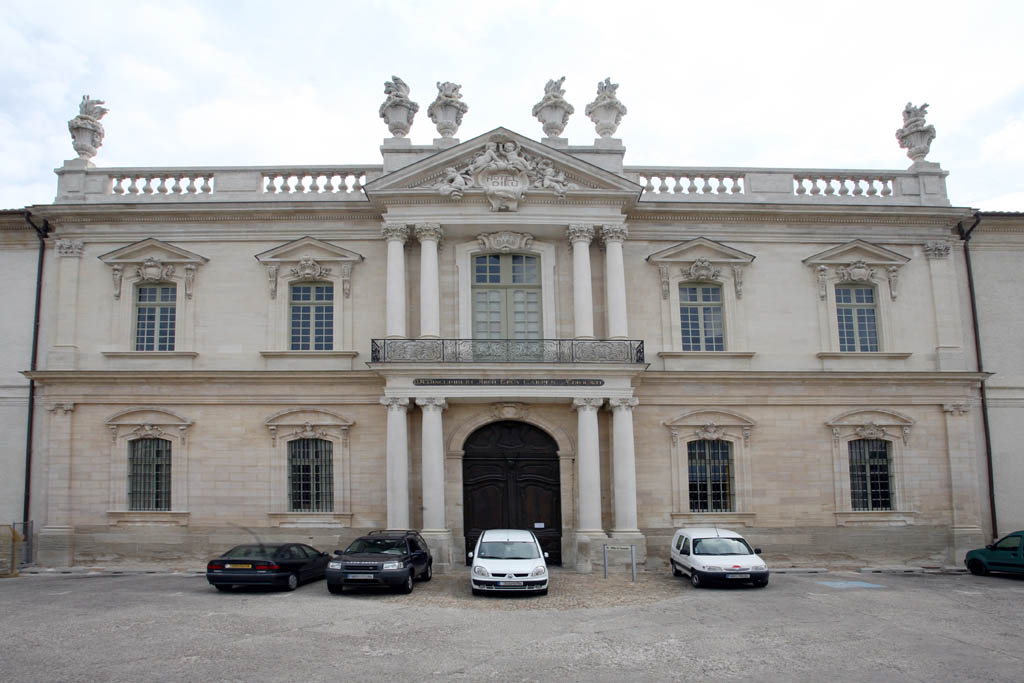
Hôtel-Dieu in Carpentras

=== Ancient Diocese of Carpentras ===
For the history of the bishopric of Carpentras, see Ancient Diocese of Carpentras.

=== Middle Ages ===
At the beginning of the Avignon Papacy, Pope Clement V took up residence, along with the Roman Curia, in Carpentras in 1313. His successor, Pope John XXII, settled definitively at Avignon.

=== The Hôtel de Ville and the Hôtel-Dieu ===
The original north-facing section of the Hôtel de Ville on Rue des Halles was completed in around 1740.

The Hôtel-Dieu on Place Aristide Briand was commissioned by Joseph-Dominique d'Inguimbert for use as a hospital and was built between 1750 and 1760. It now accommodates the Bibliothèque Inguimbertine which Jean-François Delmas, the chief librarian, has called "the oldest of our municipal libraries".

=== French Revolution and return to France ===
Until 1791, Carpentras was part of the Papal States, not of the Kingdom of France.

Like most communities across France, Carpentras played a role in the 1789-1799 French Revolution, particularly during the rule of the French Directory. After the 'Anti-Royalist' September 4, 1797 Coup of 18 Fructidor, on October 22, 1797, counter-revolutionaries attacked the Hôtel de Ville.

=== Jewish community ===
Into the 20th and 21st centuries, Carpentras has been an important centre of French Judaism and is home to the oldest synagogue in France, which opened in 1367. The Jewish cemetery was desecrated by members of the French and European Nationalist Party in May 1990, causing a public uproar and a demonstration in Paris that was attended by 200,000 people, including then-president François Mitterrand.

== Population ==
Historical population

Year	Pop.	±% p.a.
1793	9,900	—
1800	8,489	−2.17%
1806	9,674	+2.20%
1821	9,099	−0.41%
1831	9,817	+0.76%
1836	9,224	−1.24%
1841	9,776	+1.17%
1846	10,198	+0.85%
1851	10,711	+0.99%
1856	10,891	+0.33%
1861	10,918	+0.05%
1866	10,848	−0.13%
1872	10,524	−0.50%
1876	10,479	−0.11%
1881	9,699	−1.54%
1886	9,685	−0.03%
1891	9,778	+0.19%
1896	10,797	+2.00%
1901	10,443	−0.66%

Year	Pop.	±% p.a.
1906	10,721	+0.53%
1911	11,390	+1.22%
1921	11,191	−0.18%
1926	11,805	+1.07%
1931	12,632	+1.36%
1936	13,732	+1.68%
1946	14,222	+0.35%
1954	15,076	+0.73%
1962	18,199	+2.38%
1968	21,388	+2.73%
1975	24,251	+1.81%
1982	24,838	+0.34%
1990	24,212	−0.32%
1999	26,090	+0.83%
2007	28,526	+1.12%
2012	28,520	−0.00%
2017	28,309	−0.15%
2023	31,619	+1.86%

Source: EHESS and INSEE (1968–2023)

== Geography ==
Carpentras stands on the banks of the river Auzon, a tributary of the Sorgue. It is 23 km southwest of Mont Ventoux, and 23 km northeast of Avignon. Carpentras station has rail connections to Sorgues and Avignon.

=== Climate ===
In the Köppen climate classification, Carpentras has a borderline humid subtropical (Cfa), and hot-summer mediterranean climate (Csa) with cool winters and hot summers. The rainiest seasons are spring (April–May) and autumn (September–October), where heavy downpours may happen.

Climate data for Carpentras (1991–2020 normals, extremes 1963–present)
Month	Jan	Feb	Mar	Apr	May	Jun	Jul	Aug	Sep	Oct	Nov	Dec	Year
Record high °C (°F)	21.0 (69.8)	23.1 (73.6)	28.1 (82.6)	30.8 (87.4)	35.4 (95.7)	44.3 (111.7)	41.6 (106.9)	42.2 (108.0)	36.0 (96.8)	31.2 (88.2)	24.9 (76.8)	21.5 (70.7)	44.3 (111.7)
Mean daily maximum °C (°F)	11.1 (52.0)	12.8 (55.0)	17.1 (62.8)	20.4 (68.7)	24.6 (76.3)	29.1 (84.4)	32.3 (90.1)	31.9 (89.4)	26.4 (79.5)	21.1 (70.0)	15.0 (59.0)	11.3 (52.3)	21.1 (70.0)
Daily mean °C (°F)	6.1 (43.0)	6.9 (44.4)	10.5 (50.9)	13.6 (56.5)	17.7 (63.9)	21.7 (71.1)	24.4 (75.9)	24.0 (75.2)	19.5 (67.1)	15.3 (59.5)	9.9 (49.8)	6.5 (43.7)	14.7 (58.5)
Mean daily minimum °C (°F)	1.0 (33.8)	1.1 (34.0)	4.0 (39.2)	6.9 (44.4)	10.8 (51.4)	14.4 (57.9)	16.5 (61.7)	16.1 (61.0)	12.7 (54.9)	9.5 (49.1)	4.9 (40.8)	1.8 (35.2)	8.3 (46.9)
Record low °C (°F)	−15.4 (4.3)	−12.5 (9.5)	−11.8 (10.8)	−2.9 (26.8)	0.1 (32.2)	4.4 (39.9)	7.6 (45.7)	6.7 (44.1)	2.2 (36.0)	−3.1 (26.4)	−9.0 (15.8)	−12.0 (10.4)	−15.4 (4.3)
Average precipitation mm (inches)	46.3 (1.82)	34.2 (1.35)	41.3 (1.63)	61.1 (2.41)	55.6 (2.19)	41.7 (1.64)	25.7 (1.01)	40.6 (1.60)	98.7 (3.89)	87.6 (3.45)	90.8 (3.57)	41.9 (1.65)	665.5 (26.20)
Average precipitation days (≥ 1.0 mm)	5.9	4.8	5.1	6.8	6.3	4.5	3.0	3.7	5.5	6.6	7.9	5.6	65.8
Mean monthly sunshine hours	151.4	173.1	229.6	243.9	285.1	328.0	363.0	326.7	257.2	190.6	148.6	138.1	2,835.3
Source: Meteociel

== Economy ==
- Roux Graineterie of Carpentras

== Traditions ==
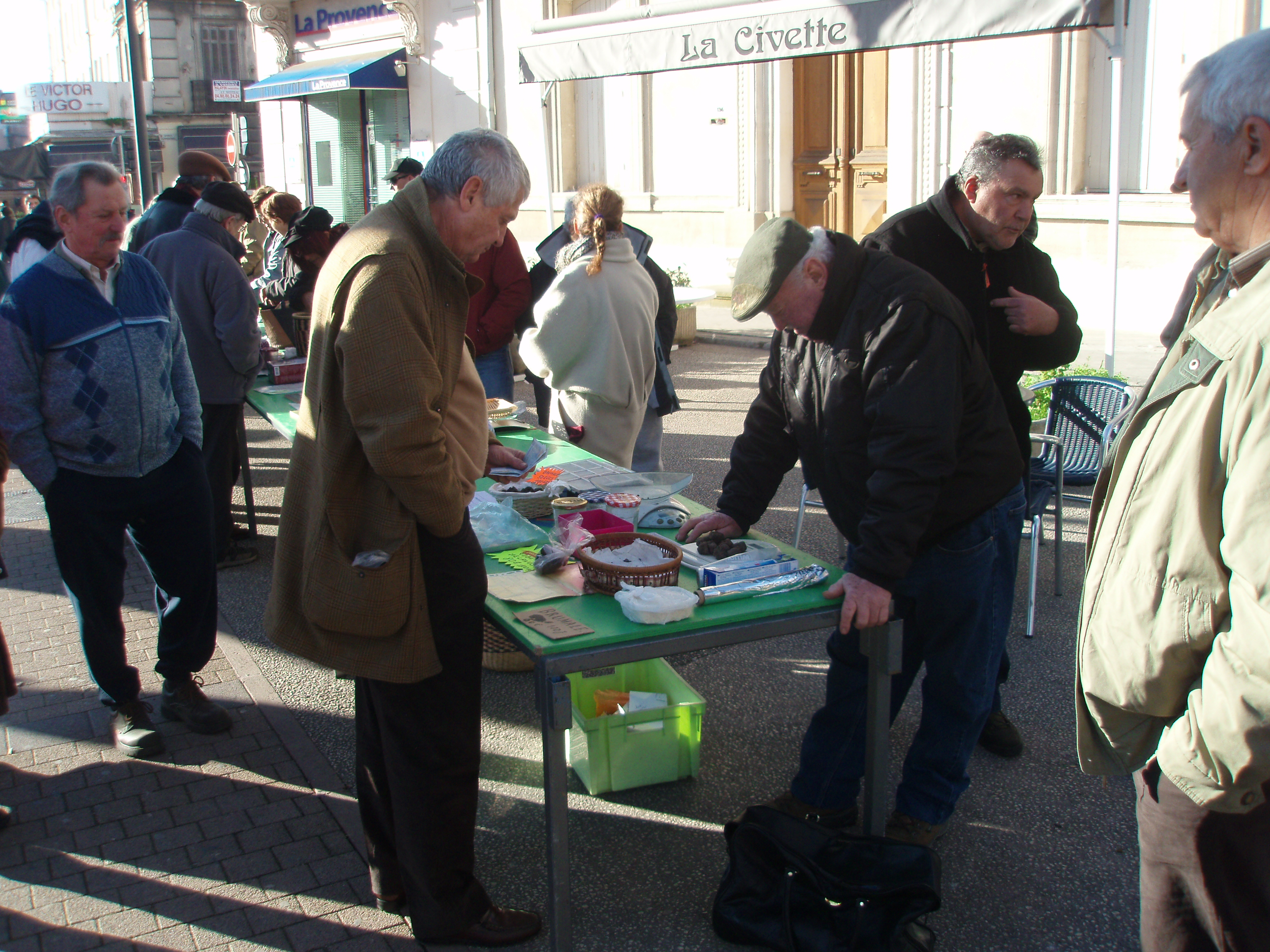
Truffle market in Carpentras

Carpentras is famous for the truffle market that takes place every Friday morning during the winter months.

Its traditional confectionery is the berlingot, a small hard candy with thin white stripes, originally made from the syrup left over from conservation of fruits.

== Personalities ==
Carpentras was the birthplace of (chronologically):

- Carpentras (also known as Elzéar Genet) (c.1470–1548), prominent early Renaissance composer
- Hercule Audiffret (1603–1659), orator and Superior General of the Congrégation des Doctrinaires
- Louis Archimbaud (1705–1789), composer and organist of Carpentras Cathedral
- Joseph Duplessis (1725–1802), portraitist
- Jean-Pierre-Xavier Bidauld (1743–1813), painter
- Jean-Joseph-Xavier Bidauld (1758–1846), painter
- Alexis-Vincent-Charles Berbiguier de Terre-Neuve du Thym, (1765–1851), author and demonologist
- Victor Olivier de Puymanel (1768–1799), French Navy volunteer, and adventurer in Vietnam
- François-Vincent Raspail (1794–1878), chemist, physiologist, and socialist
- Jean-Joseph Bonaventure Laurens (1801–1890), painter, lithographer, musician
- Édouard Daladier (1884–1970), politician and Prime Minister of France at the start of the Second World War
- Daniel Lazard (1941–), computer scientist
- Bruno Boscherie (1950–), fencer, Olympic Gold medalist
- Christophe Maé (1975–), musician and composer
- Éric Salignon (1982–), racing driver
- Thomas Mangani (1987–), professional footballer
- Raphaël Cacérès (1987–), professional footballer

== International relations ==
Carpentras is twinned with:

- Vevey, Switzerland
- Seesen, Germany
- (United States) Ponchatoula, Louisiana, USA
- Camaiore, Italy

== See also ==
- Arch of Carpentras
- Communes of the Vaucluse department
- Henri Raybaud
- Hôtel-Dieu of Carpentras
