= Bulbophyllum sect. Piestobulbon =

Scientific classification
- Kingdom: Plantae
- Clade: Tracheophytes
- Clade: Angiosperms
- Clade: Monocots
- Order: Asparagales
- Family: Orchidaceae
- Subfamily: Epidendroideae
- Genus: Bulbophyllum
- Section: Bulbophyllum sect. Piestobulbon; Schltr. 1923

Type species
- Bulbophyllum piestobulbon

Species
- See text

Section of flowering plants

Bulbophyllum sect. Piestobulbon is a section of the genus Bulbophyllum.

== Description ==
Species in this section are epiphytes with a pseudobulb with a single leaf and inflorescence.

== Distribution ==
Plants from this section are found in New Guinea.

== Species ==
Bulbophyllum section Piestobulbon comprises the following species:

Image	Name	Distribution	Elevation (m)
	Bulbophyllum fasciculiferumSchltr. 1923	New Guinea	800 metres (2,600 ft)
	Bulbophyllum leucorhodum Schltr. 1913	New Guinea	1,000 metres (3,300 ft)
	Bulbophyllum paucisetum J.J.Sm. 1915	New Guinea	
	Bulbophyllum piestobulbon Schltr. 1923	New Guinea and the Solomon Islands	0–1,200 metres (0–3,937 ft)
