= Saint-Vérand =

Saint-Vérand is the name of 3 communes in France:

- Saint-Vérand, Isère
- Saint-Vérand, Rhône
- Saint-Vérand, Saône-et-Loire

== See also ==
- Saint-Véran Lake, a waterbody of the Moncouche River in Quebec, Canada]
- Saint-Véran, a commune in the Hautes-Alpes department
- Saint-Véran AOC, a white Burgundy wine from the area around Saint-Vérand, Saône-et-Loire
