= Cavaillon =

- Commune
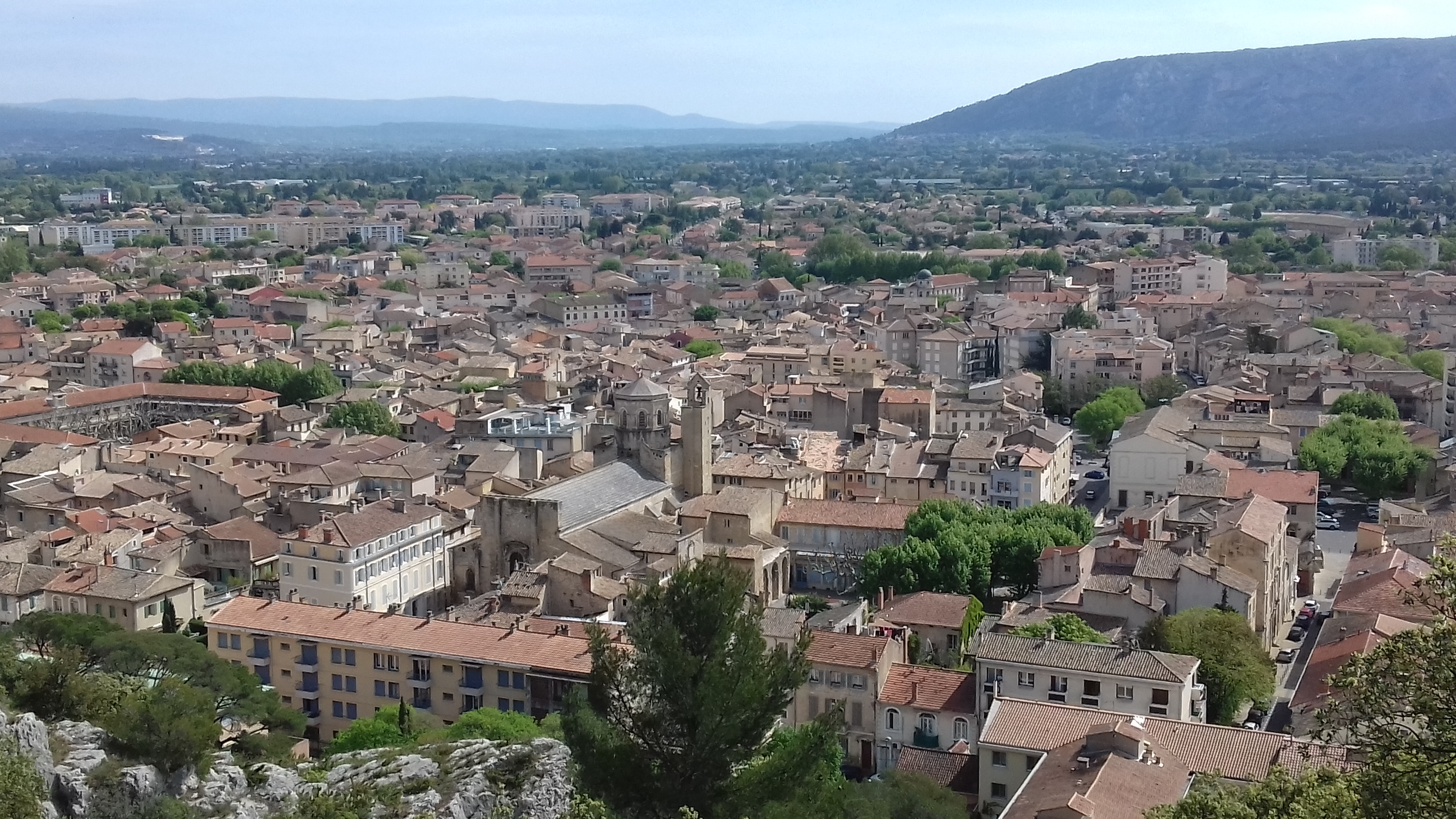
- A view of Cavaillon

- Coat of arms
- Location of Cavaillon
- Location within France Location within Provence-Alpes-Côte d'Azur
- Coordinates: 43°50′15″N 5°02′17″E
- Country: France
- Region: Provence-Alpes-Côte d'Azur
- Department: Vaucluse
- Arrondissement: Apt
- Canton: Cavaillon
- Intercommunality: CA Luberon Monts de Vaucluse

Government
  - Mayor (2020–2026): Gérard Daudet
- Area^{1}: 45.96 km^{2} (17.75 sq mi)
- Elevation: 75 m (246 ft)
- Highest elevation: 200 m (660 ft)
- Lowest elevation: 49 m (161 ft)
- Population (2023): 25,636
  - Density: 557.8/km^{2} (1,445/sq mi)
- Time zone: UTC+01:00 (CET)
  - Summer (DST): UTC+02:00 (CEST)
- INSEE/Postal code: 84035 /84300
- ^{1} French Land Register data, which excludes lakes, ponds, glaciers > 1 km^{2} (0.386 sq mi or 247 acres) and river estuaries.

Cavaillon (French pronunciation: [kavajɔ̃]; Occitan: Cavalhon) is a commune in the Vaucluse department in the Provence-Alpes-Côte d'Azur region of Southeastern France. It is situated in the Durance Valley, at the foot of the Luberon mountains.

== History ==
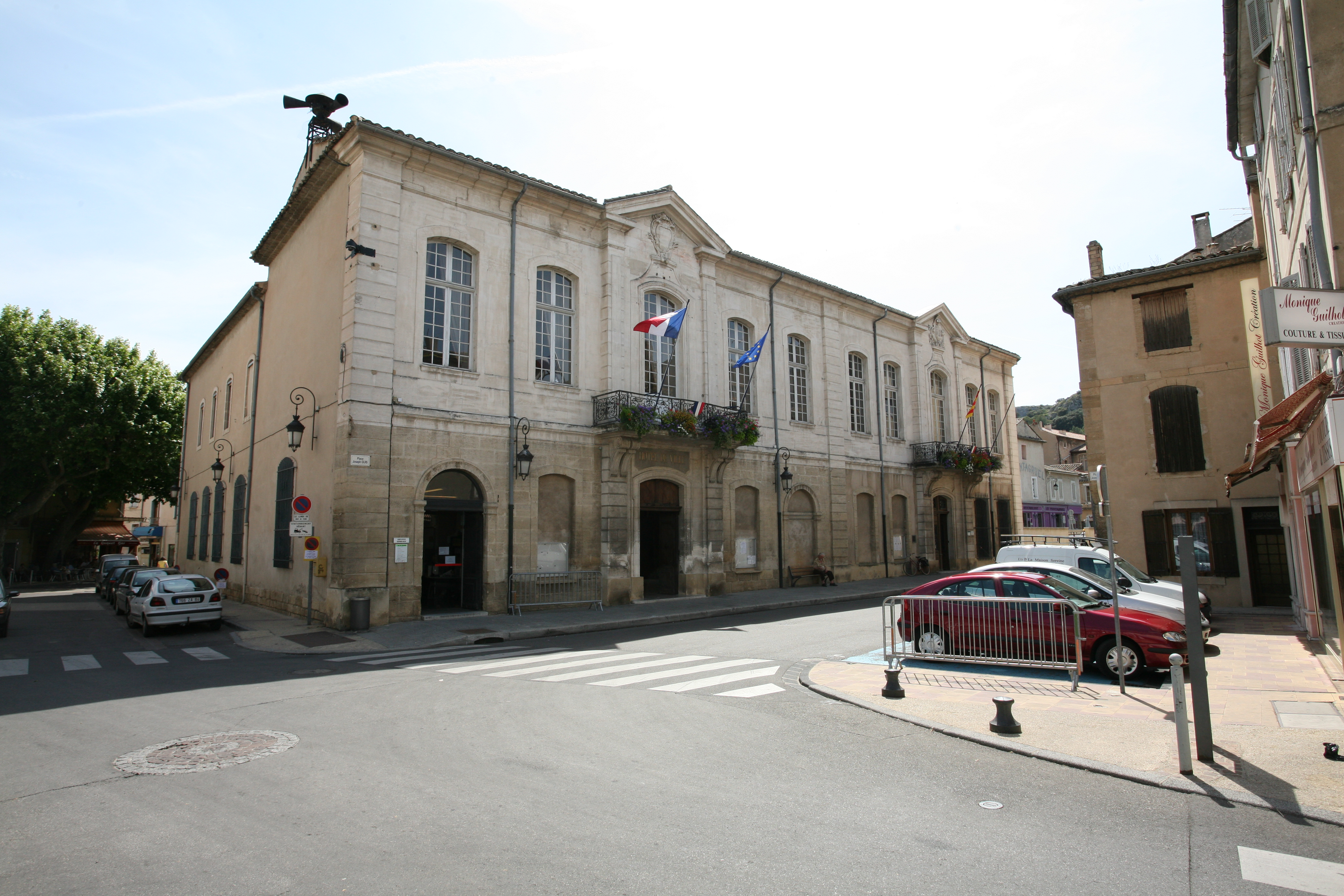
The Hôtel de Ville

Cavaillon was already a city in the Gallo-Roman period, and has several minor relics from that era, including a 1st century triumphal arch. Other minor relics of the Roman period have been found to the south of the town, on the site of the ancient Cabellio. It was the seat of the bishops of Cavaillon from the 4th century until the French Revolution. Saint Veran was bishop here in the 6th century, and the 12th-century cathedral is dedicated to him. In the Middle Ages Cavaillon was part of the Comtat Venaissin.

The Hôtel de Ville was completed in 1753.

== Geography ==
Cavaillon is part of the Regional and Natural Park of Luberon (parc naturel régional du Luberon) in the French Department of Vaucluse.

The Calavon, a tributary of the Durance locally called Coulon, flows westward through the middle of the commune.

The Durance forms the commune's south-western border.

== Population ==
Historical population

Year	Pop.	±% p.a.
1793	5,193	—
1800	5,192	−0.00%
1806	5,750	+1.72%
1821	6,360	+0.67%
1831	6,911	+0.83%
1836	7,041	+0.37%
1841	7,195	+0.43%
1846	7,428	+0.64%
1851	7,405	−0.06%
1856	7,431	+0.07%
1861	7,779	+0.92%
1866	8,034	+0.65%
1872	8,034	+0.00%
1876	8,454	+1.28%
1881	8,591	+0.32%
1886	9,144	+1.26%
1891	9,077	−0.15%
1896	9,405	+0.71%
1901	9,850	+0.93%

Year	Pop.	±% p.a.
1906	9,952	+0.21%
1911	9,416	−1.10%
1921	8,991	−0.46%
1926	10,451	+3.06%
1931	11,743	+2.36%
1936	12,522	+1.29%
1946	13,804	+0.98%
1954	14,831	+0.90%
1962	17,058	+1.76%
1968	18,544	+1.40%
1975	21,259	+1.97%
1982	20,615	−0.44%
1990	23,102	+1.43%
1999	24,563	+0.68%
2007	25,596	+0.52%
2012	25,289	−0.24%
2017	26,641	+1.05%
2023	25,636	−0.64%

Source: EHESS and INSEE (1968-2023)

== Economy ==
Cavaillon is famous for its melons, as well as other early fruits and vegetables.

== Famous people ==
- Saint César de Bus
- Castil-Blaze, French musicologist, Music critic and Composer
- Luc Bulot, French palaeontologist
- Pierre Salinger, press secretary to U.S. President John F. Kennedy, U.S. Senator from California, Paris bureau chief for ABC News

== Sights ==
- the 11th-13th century Cavaillon Cathedral
- Colline Saint-Jacques, with chapel
- Roman triumphal arch
- the 15th-18th century synagogue, housing the Jewish Museum

== Twin towns ==
- Cavaillon has been twinned with Weinheim, Germany, since 1958 and Langhirano, Italy, since 2001.

== Climate ==
Climate data for Cavaillon (1981–2010 normals, extremes 1962–present)
Month	Jan	Feb	Mar	Apr	May	Jun	Jul	Aug	Sep	Oct	Nov	Dec	Year
Record high °C (°F)	20.5 (68.9)	22.3 (72.1)	27.1 (80.8)	29.8 (85.6)	34.1 (93.4)	37.5 (99.5)	39.0 (102.2)	38.9 (102.0)	35.0 (95.0)	29.4 (84.9)	26.5 (79.7)	20.3 (68.5)	39.0 (102.2)
Mean daily maximum °C (°F)	9.9 (49.8)	11.7 (53.1)	15.6 (60.1)	18.6 (65.5)	23.2 (73.8)	27.2 (81.0)	30.5 (86.9)	29.8 (85.6)	25.0 (77.0)	19.9 (67.8)	13.6 (56.5)	10.2 (50.4)	19.6 (67.3)
Daily mean °C (°F)	5.3 (41.5)	6.6 (43.9)	9.9 (49.8)	12.7 (54.9)	17.0 (62.6)	20.7 (69.3)	23.5 (74.3)	23.0 (73.4)	19.0 (66.2)	14.8 (58.6)	9.1 (48.4)	5.9 (42.6)	14.0 (57.2)
Mean daily minimum °C (°F)	0.7 (33.3)	1.4 (34.5)	4.2 (39.6)	6.9 (44.4)	10.7 (51.3)	14.2 (57.6)	16.6 (61.9)	16.2 (61.2)	12.9 (55.2)	9.6 (49.3)	4.6 (40.3)	1.6 (34.9)	8.3 (46.9)
Record low °C (°F)	−17.0 (1.4)	−19.0 (−2.2)	−11.5 (11.3)	−2.1 (28.2)	0.0 (32.0)	4.0 (39.2)	7.2 (45.0)	6.6 (43.9)	2.0 (35.6)	−4.2 (24.4)	−9.2 (15.4)	−20.0 (−4.0)	−20.0 (−4.0)
Average precipitation mm (inches)	48.3 (1.90)	37.5 (1.48)	38.9 (1.53)	64.5 (2.54)	57.7 (2.27)	34.1 (1.34)	19.2 (0.76)	44.3 (1.74)	96.5 (3.80)	91.0 (3.58)	69.4 (2.73)	51.6 (2.03)	653.0 (25.71)
Average precipitation days (≥ 1.0 mm)	5.6	5.1	4.8	7.1	6.1	4.2	2.3	3.3	5.2	7.4	6.6	5.9	63.5
Source: Meteociel

== See also ==
- Communes of the Vaucluse department
- Antoine Sartorio
- Ancient Diocese of Cavaillon
