= Saint-Véran =

- Commune
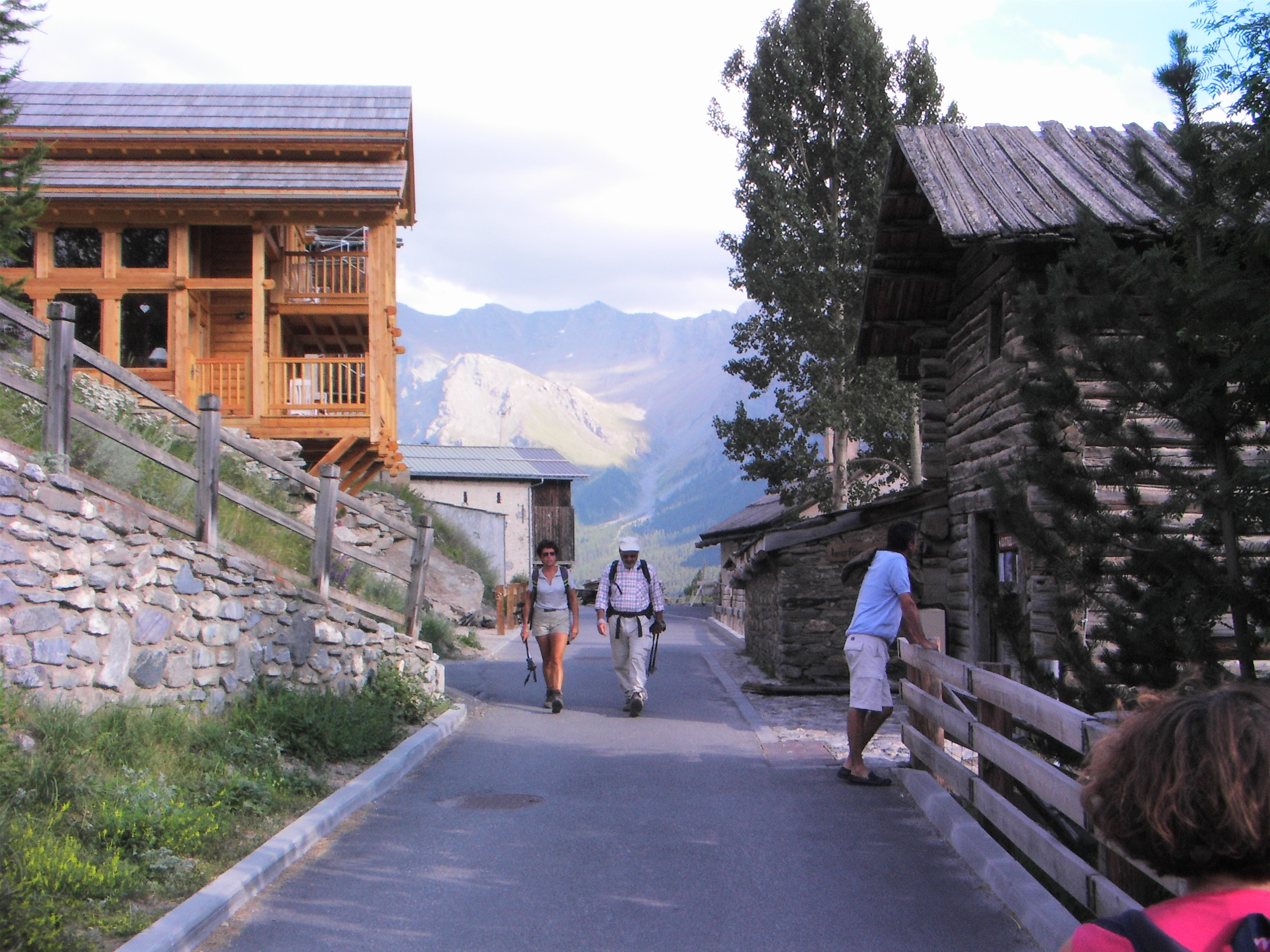
- A view within Saint-Véran, in August 2008

- Coat of arms
- Location of Saint-Véran
- Location within France Location within Provence-Alpes-Côte d'Azur
- Coordinates: 44°42′03″N 6°52′09″E
- Country: France
- Region: Provence-Alpes-Côte d'Azur
- Department: Hautes-Alpes
- Arrondissement: Briançon
- Canton: Guillestre

Government
  - Mayor (2026–32): Delphine Mathieu
- Area^{1}: 44.75 km^{2} (17.28 sq mi)
- Elevation: 2,042 m (6,699 ft)
- Population (2023): 160
  - Density: 3.6/km^{2} (9.3/sq mi)
- Time zone: UTC+01:00 (CET)
  - Summer (DST): UTC+02:00 (CEST)
- INSEE/Postal code: 05157 /05350
- ^{1} French Land Register data, which excludes lakes, ponds, glaciers > 1 km^{2} (0.386 sq mi or 247 acres) and river estuaries.

Saint-Véran (French pronunciation: [sɛ̃ veʁɑ̃]; Occitan: Sent Veran [ˈsã vˈʀã]) is a commune in the Hautes-Alpes department in southeastern France in the Queyras Regional Natural Park. It is a member of Les Plus Beaux Villages de France (The Most Beautiful Villages of France) Association.

== Geography ==
Saint-Véran, located in the French Alps, is the most elevated commune in France and in Western Europe. It is the third highest village in Europe, after Trepalle in Italy and Juf in Switzerland.

The permanent population is around 300 but swells with tourists in both summer and winter. In addition to tourism the main activities are agriculture and woodcraft.

=== Climate ===
Saint-Véran has a humid continental climate (Köppen climate classification Dfb). The average annual temperature in Saint-Véran is 5.3 °C (41.5 °F). The average annual rainfall is 709.6 mm (27.94 in) with June as the wettest month. The temperatures are highest on average in July, at around 13.9 °C (57.0 °F), and lowest in January, at around −1.8 °C (28.8 °F). The highest temperature ever recorded in Saint-Véran was 30.7 °C (87.3 °F) on 23 August 1961; the coldest temperature ever recorded was −26.0 °C (−14.8 °F) on 10 February 1986.

Climate data for Saint-Véran (1981–2010 averages, extremes 1951−present)
Month	Jan	Feb	Mar	Apr	May	Jun	Jul	Aug	Sep	Oct	Nov	Dec	Year
Record high °C (°F)	15.5 (59.9)	16.0 (60.8)	17.8 (64.0)	20.0 (68.0)	23.8 (74.8)	29.1 (84.4)	30.0 (86.0)	30.7 (87.3)	28.2 (82.8)	24.5 (76.1)	19.9 (67.8)	17.5 (63.5)	30.7 (87.3)
Mean daily maximum °C (°F)	3.1 (37.6)	3.8 (38.8)	6.1 (43.0)	8.0 (46.4)	12.3 (54.1)	16.5 (61.7)	20.1 (68.2)	20.1 (68.2)	16.4 (61.5)	12.0 (53.6)	6.4 (43.5)	3.3 (37.9)	10.7 (51.3)
Daily mean °C (°F)	−1.8 (28.8)	−1.6 (29.1)	0.7 (33.3)	2.7 (36.9)	7.0 (44.6)	10.8 (51.4)	13.9 (57.0)	13.9 (57.0)	10.4 (50.7)	6.7 (44.1)	1.7 (35.1)	−1.2 (29.8)	5.3 (41.5)
Mean daily minimum °C (°F)	−6.6 (20.1)	−7.0 (19.4)	−4.7 (23.5)	−2.6 (27.3)	1.8 (35.2)	5.1 (41.2)	7.8 (46.0)	7.6 (45.7)	4.4 (39.9)	1.3 (34.3)	−3.0 (26.6)	−5.8 (21.6)	−0.1 (31.8)
Record low °C (°F)	−22.0 (−7.6)	−26.0 (−14.8)	−24.8 (−12.6)	−14.2 (6.4)	−10.0 (14.0)	−6.2 (20.8)	−2.2 (28.0)	−2.5 (27.5)	−6.1 (21.0)	−12.0 (10.4)	−17.0 (1.4)	−19.3 (−2.7)	−26.0 (−14.8)
Average precipitation mm (inches)	40.7 (1.60)	33.3 (1.31)	42.2 (1.66)	68.5 (2.70)	63.5 (2.50)	83.1 (3.27)	53.2 (2.09)	59.3 (2.33)	71.5 (2.81)	83.0 (3.27)	59.0 (2.32)	52.3 (2.06)	709.6 (27.94)
Average precipitation days (≥ 1.0 mm)	6.4	5.3	6.8	9.0	10.2	9.5	7.1	8.1	7.0	8.6	7.0	7.3	92.4
Source: Meteociel

== History ==
Copper mines were already being exploited during the Bronze Age within the commune’s territory, producing seven tons of copper annually—a mass production scale for the time. Bornite (a copper sulfide mineral) was extracted here, but the site also yielded significant quantities of native copper. As of 2010, further studies are still needed to confirm whether it might rank among the rare protohistoric French sites exploiting native copper. It is hypothesized that the presence of native copper may have triggered the intensive mining of bornite. Some ancient excavations, such as the Tranchée des Anciens (Trench of the Ancients), as well as much more recent gallery entrances, remain visible today.

Timbering from the Galerie des Anciens (Gallery of the Ancients) has been dated to 3635 ~ 80 BP (approximately 2300–1750 BCE).

Middle Ages

The legend of Saint Véran of Cavaillon recounts that the bishop of Cavaillon, born in Gévaudan during the 6th century, wounded a dragon ravaging the Cavaillon region in the southern Vaucluse department. He then chased it away, commanding it to die in the Alps. As the Coulobre (the dragon) retreated, bleeding, its blood droplets fell to the ground, allegedly explaining the existence of other French villages named Saint-Vérand in Vaucluse, Isère, and Rhône.

A significant portion of the population was Protestant and had fled persecution, as evidenced by the village temple and biblical verses inscribed above doorways.

Early Modern Period

Historically, the village thrived on artisanal crafts such as basketry, toolmaking, cabinet-making, carpentry, and agriculture. It also hosted slate production in galleries carved into cliffs.

20th Century

In 1925, the village was selected for reconstruction during the International Exhibition of White Coal (hydroelectric power) held in Grenoble.

At Christmas 1937, the Pré du Géant ski lift was inaugurated, enabling the practice of the trendy sport of alpine skiing. Skiers were transported from hotels via horse-drawn sleighs. World War II halted this activity, which was only revived in 1952.

Producers of the France 3 television show C'est pas sorcier (It’s Not Rocket Science) filmed two episodes here: one for Christmas 1995 and another for New Year’s Eve 1996.

== Name ==
The village is named after Saint Véran, 6th century Bishop of Cavaillon who in legend drove away a dragon.

The Observatoire de Saint-Véran was constructed nearby by the Observatoire de Paris in the early 1970s.

== Population ==
Historical population
Year	Pop.	±% p.a.
1968	220	—
1975	232	+0.76%
1982	275	+2.46%
1990	257	−0.84%
1999	267	+0.43%
2007	296	+1.30%
2012	274	−1.53%
2017	236	−2.94%
2023	160	−6.27%
Source: INSEE

== See also ==
- Communes of the Hautes-Alpes department
