= Albenga Cathedral =

Cathedral in Albenga, Italy

Coordinates: 44°02′57.16″N 8°12′49.31″E

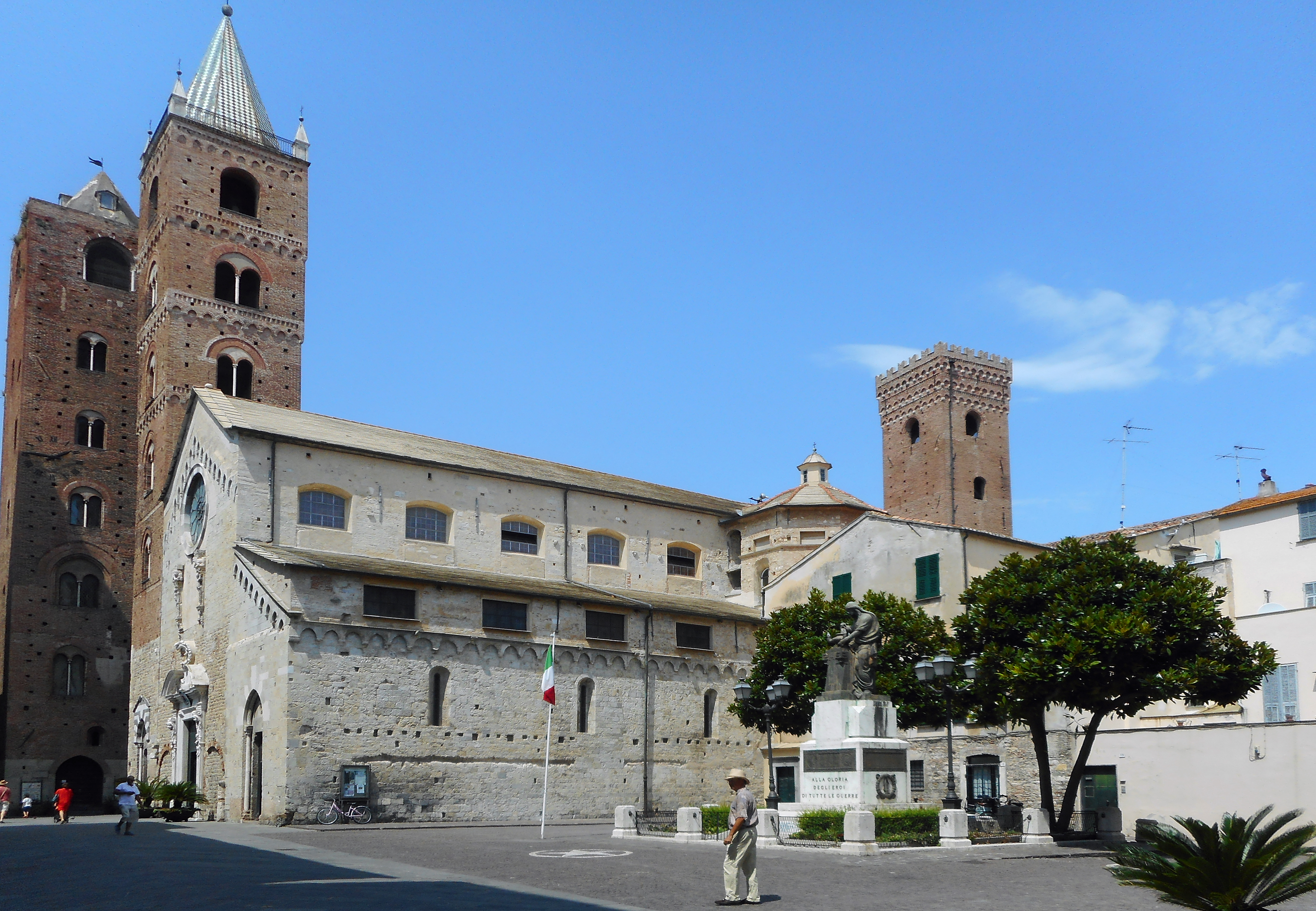
Albenga Cathedral

Albenga Cathedral (Italian: Cattedrale di San Michele Arcangelo, Duomo di Albenga) is a Roman Catholic cathedral dedicated to Saint Michael in the city of Albenga, in the province of Savona and the region of Liguria, Italy. It is the seat of the Diocese of Albenga-Imperia.

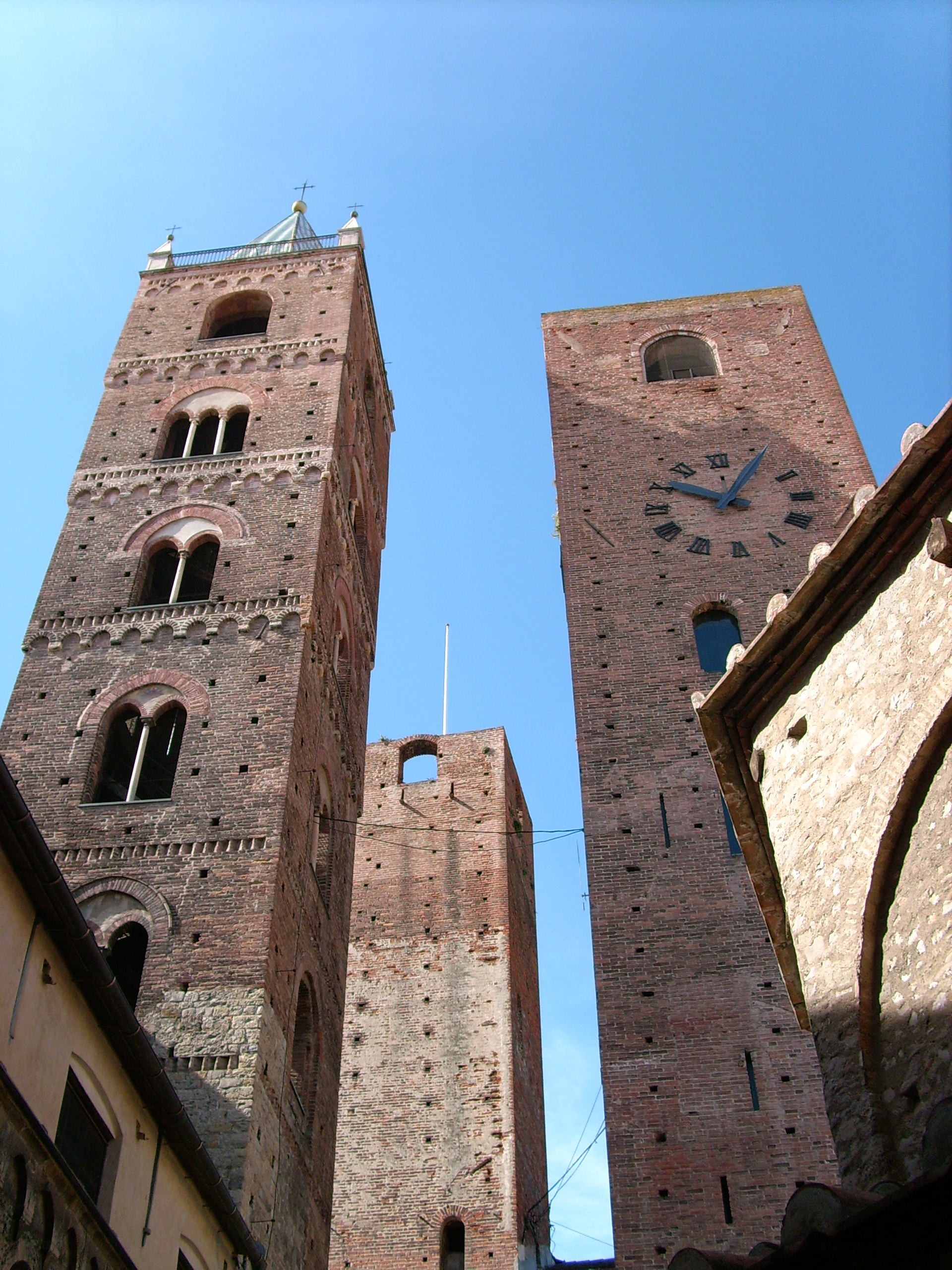
Bell tower

A church has occupied the site since the turn of the 4th to the 5th century, but the present structure is medieval, built in about 1100, with a major rebuilding in the second half of the 12th century, and another in 1582. A restoration project in the 1970s largely returned the building to the medieval structure. The bell tower was rebuilt in its present form in the 1390s.

The relics of Saint Veranus (San Verano), who was instrumental in the Christianisation of Albenga in the 6th century, are preserved in a shrine.

The cathedral interior is well stocked with sculptures and works of art. The 19th century ceiling frescos are by Maurizio and Tommaso Carrega. Other frescos, particularly those in the apse, are of the 15th century. The right hand nave contains a fresco by the artist Il Pancalino of Saint Clare and two donors, and of the Crucifixion with Saints Anthony the Great and John the Evangelist, with the bishop of Albenga. The altarpiece on the high altar depicts Saint Veranus, Saint Michael and John the Baptist.

The cathedral also owns two paintings of the late 14th century by Luca Baudo of Saint Eligius and Saint Ampelius; a painting of the Miracle of St. Veranus by Giovanni Lanfranco; and a Madonna and Child with Saints by Orazio de Ferrari (the last two are not publicly displayed for security reasons).

== Name ==
Name All the written documentation in our possession assigns the title of the Cathedral of ingauna to St. Michael the Archangel. A tradition has it that on the road that leads from Albenga to Alassio there was a snake that killed anyone who passed. The population made a procession praying to St. Michael the Archangel to kill the snake. During the night a glow was seen coming from the sky and heading towards a point on the road; the population rushed in, and found the snake killed.

The protection of San Michele was widespread in the Lombards period, when the people in arms invoked the Saint and to whose effigy they swore fidelity before the fight. However, the proliferation of the cult dates back to the Byzantine era, and at the time the city of Albenga had close commercial relations with the Byzantine Empire, so the title of the cathedral to San Michele can place us at its first building.

Main facade

However, documents emerged for which it was thought that for some time it could have been attributed to San Giovanni: the first document dates back to 1076 and dealt with the sale of a mill, in which the presence of eleven Sancti Iohannis milites is mentioned. The document by which the bishop of Albenga donated churches in the surroundings of Porto Maurizio to the Lérins Abbey dates back to 1103, the donation provided for a quoque anno aecclesia Sancti Iohannis ac Sancti Michaelis Albinguinensis aecclesie reddat solidos duos ...; this document, however, does not give the cathedral the double name, but speaks of two separate structures. Still documents that have also come down to us from the Templars include the church of San Giovanni. However, this was explained by analyzing all the documentation, that is, the cathedral-baptistery complex was built together, and it is likely that the baptistery itself was named after St. John the Baptist as a place of baptism and that the diocese referred to this structure as one of the main places of episcopal reference.

Albenga had its name linked to that of military saints, from Saint Calocero to Martin of Tours, but also in the church of St. George, or in the findings of the church of St. Teodoro, since the fortifications built by Costanzo created a city militarized in the Byzantine period.

== History ==
Location of Albenga Cathedral

Located in the center of the medieval city of Albenga, the foundation of the original building of worship date back to the reconstruction of the city (between the 4th and early 5th centuries), in the center of the Roman city. It stands on the site with the exact dimensions of the early Christian one. Its rebuilding occurred around 1100, on the ruins of the early Christian church, and again in the second half of the 20th century.

According to tradition, in the road that leads from Albenga to Alassio, there was a snake that killed everyone. The people made a procession praying Archangel Michael to kill the snake. During the night he saw a glow coming from the sky and head towards a point on the road, people noticed quickly, and found the snake killed.

=== The first plant ===
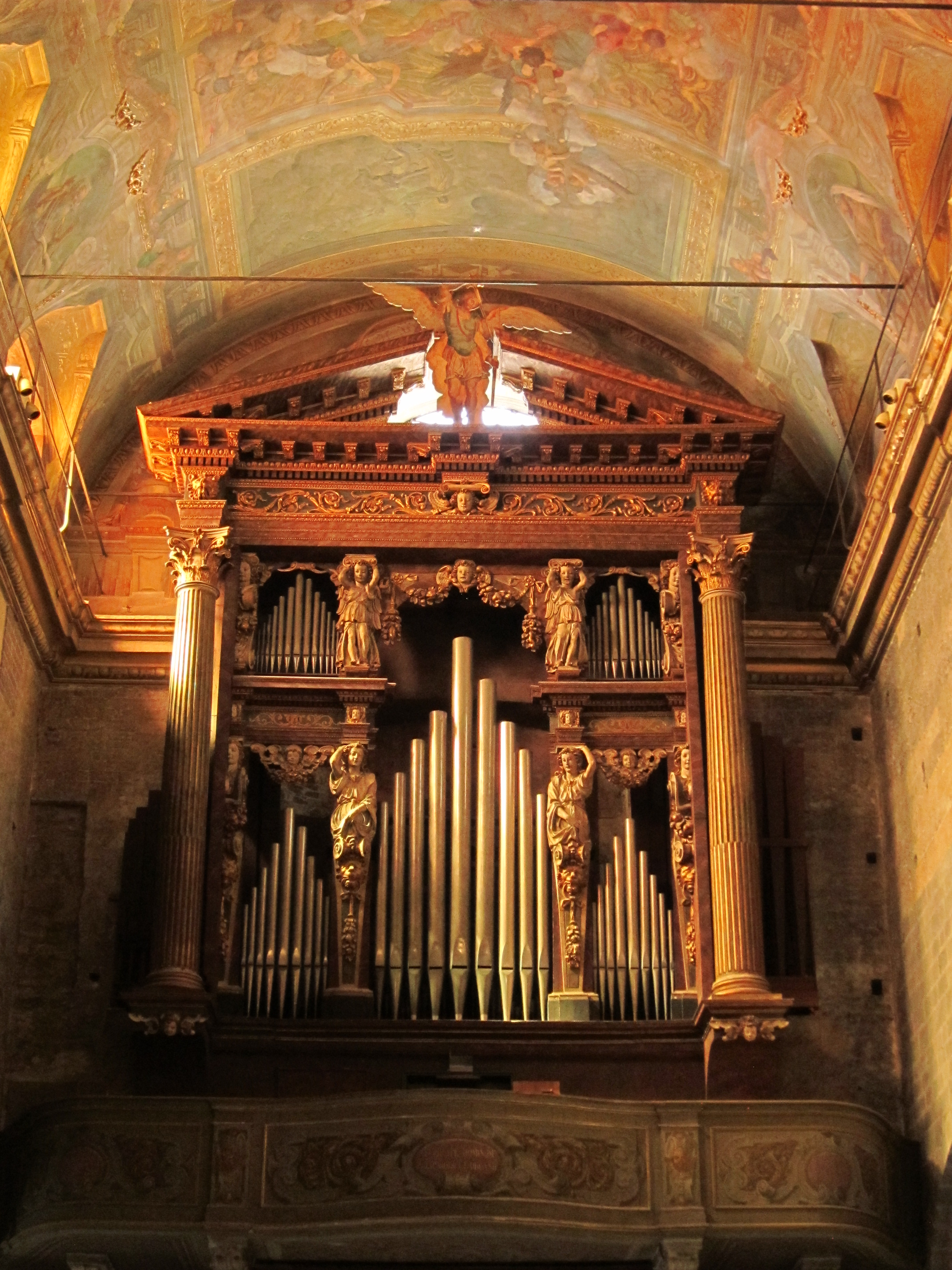
Organ above the main entrance.

A first study of the ancient early Christian structure was undertaken between 1964 and 1967, which revealed that the building had a basilica plan and was very large; during the archaeological excavation, the bases of two columns near the altar were discovered.

After the conquest of Liguria in 643 by the Lombard king Rothari, the cathedral was reduced in size. A third level of flooring was added only in the central nave, placed over the second 6th-century floor, while the two side naves remained outside the church and served as burial places, probably for privileged individuals. This is significant as it suggests that the population was poorer and smaller, and therefore, a large hall could not be maintained.

Thanks to the division of the Ligurian territory into marches, which gave greater importance to Albenga and its diocese, the structure was rebuilt in the 11th century in proto-Romanesque forms, with a single nave and crypt. The phases of this reconstruction are still visible today in the lower masonry of the facade.

The current structure of the cathedral is the result of another reconstruction that took place at the end of the 12th century, although some sources suggest this enlargement may have occurred in the early decades of the 13th century, restoring the building's layout to the original basilica plan. This involved replacing the longitudinal walls with new columns featuring pointed arches. Little medieval documentation has survived to this day.

In the early 16th century, the Dominican Giacomo Salomonio brought attention to the ancient history of Albenga, and among the eminent scholars were Bernardo Ricci and Nicolò D’Aste. A note from Brother Giacomo Salomonio mentions the poor condition of the cathedral. Further modifications were undertaken in 1582 under the local bishop Luca Fieschi, prompted by the apostolic visitor Nicolò Mascardi, to adapt the structure to the new guidelines of the Counter-Reformation. The work involved raising the floor by about one meter to align it with the level of the square in front of the church, encasing the columns in pilasters, and replacing the wooden roof with new vaulted structures. A barrel vault was built in the central nave, while cross vaults were added in the two side naves. Additionally, new lighting points were introduced to illuminate the cathedral, along with new decorative elements, stucco, and sculptures on the railings and altars. Domes were built over the lateral arms of the transept, the windows were altered, and the pointed arches of the central nave were demolished and replaced with polycentric arches positioned higher.

=== Reconstruction ===
Towards the 12th century, Albenga experienced a period of dominance along the coast, thanks to significant commercial growth and the security provided by the protection of the Holy Roman Emperor to counter Genoa. The chapter of the cathedral was established, and shortly thereafter, the communal palace (palacium comunis) was founded in the current Piazza San Michele. The relationship between the civic and episcopal powers allowed for the city's growth, which necessitated a new meeting place, and thus, the reconstruction of the cathedral began. Except for the facade, the proto-Romanesque structures were demolished, but the materials were reused in the new building, resulting in a basilica structure with three naves, in accordance with the proportions of the late antique period, traces of which had been preserved. Next to the facade, the bell tower had previously stood externally, but it was incorporated into the new structure. On the left side, there was a cemetery area and an external chapel to the central nave of the cathedral, which was consolidated into the new structure. However, the situation on the right side of the cathedral remains uncertain, where there was partially a cloister connecting it to Santa Maria in Fontibus, and it may have been used as a burial area or included a chapel. These modifications allowed the structure to accommodate the entire chapter, which was quite numerous between the 11th and 12th centuries.

The reconstruction restored the original level of the ancient floor and highlighted the proto-Romanesque underground crypt, which had been filled during the 12th-13th century construction. Historical documents about Albenga are only certain from the second half of the 13th century; prior to that, references are only found in testamentary acts. It remains unclear who and when ordered the new construction, although it is known that it was funded by the municipality. In the Albenga statutes of 1288 and 1350, there is always a reference to the budget item for the Opera Sancti Michealis, but the amount remained roughly the same, covering lighting and ordinary maintenance work. There is, however, an important chapter regarding the construction of the Villenove. It is presumed that the construction was overseen by a magister rationalis, tasked with supervising the site. In fact, Nino Lamboglia concluded that this work took place in 1270, based on a 16th-century inscription found during restoration work and dedicated to an altar of Saint Veranus of the Cepolla family, with the inscription: 1270 Manuel quondam Guglielmi fundavit, Prosperque Petri nobilis familie Cepule redificavit 1583. However, no nobleman with that name appears in the records from 1270; the name only appears in the following century. It is likely that Prospero Cepolla, a 16th-century noble, had the inscription backdated to claim greater antiquity for his lineage compared to his rivals. This hypothesis is supported by the fact that significant renovation work was done on the noble families’ altars in the second half of the 14th century.

=== 14th Century Appearance ===
The first description of the church’s interior comes from the chapter statutes of 1318, revised by Bishop Federico in 1335, where the functions and presence of the altars dedicated to Saint Michael the Archangel, Saint John the Baptist, Saint Veranus, Saint Mary Magdalene, Saint Stephen, and Saint Anthony are defined. On the main altar, there was an icon dedicated to the patron saint, which had deteriorated by 1367. Consequently, Canon Lorenzo da Chiavari made a contract with Francesco da Genova for the creation of a new conea magna (large icon). This work may have been funded by the will of Emanuele Cipolla, who in 1345 had requested to be buried in front of the main altar and that a crucifix be made for the cathedral with his image at its feet and various saintly figures in plaster cum picturis decentibus (with appropriate paintings). There is no trace of these works, leaving it unclear whether they have disappeared over the centuries or were never realized. During this period, frescoes were created around the main altar, some of which are still faintly visible today.

The altar of Saint John the Baptist had been located since medieval times at the head of the right nave; the saint was the protector of the diocese, and therefore his altar had to be in a prominent position next to that of Saint Michael. In 1504, Bishop Leonardo Marchese established a chaplaincy dedicated to Saint Mary and Saint Stephen on the altar of Saint Stephen. Saint Stephen was highly venerated in Albenga, as evidenced by his inscription in the baptistery mosaic.

Saint Veranus was also greatly revered in Albenga. The chapter commissioned the notary Bernabò Pognana to write a Vita Sancti Verani; the patronage of the chapel belonged to the wealthy citizen Giacomo Bausanus, who on May 18, 1442, bequeathed a sum for its restoration and for annual upkeep. The work began in 1460 under the direction of Bishop Napoleon Fieschi.

=== The New Bell Tower ===
Only in the 14th century did extensive documented renovation work on the bell tower begin, funded by the city. The municipality chose Serafino Mignano, a canon of the cathedral, as the person responsible for the works. This decision was not made because Mignano was part of the governing elite of Saint Michael the Archangel, but because he was an experienced builder, to the point that the Albenga municipality entrusted him with other projects, assisted by the citizen Antonio Campeggi.

The origin of the first bell tower is unknown, although the masonry matches the interior proto-Romanesque construction. The first document attesting to the presence of the bell tower is the Statutes of 1288. The lower part of the tower, originally built outside the cathedral during the proto-Romanesque period when only the central nave existed, was incorporated into the church when it was restored to its original three-nave layout during the Romanesque-Gothic period. This was achieved by opening two large arches that connected the base of the bell tower to the main nave and the left nave. The ancient tower structure likely had issues, as seen from the chapter statutes, which clearly stated that the first funds had to be allocated to the bell tower. By the late 14th century, conditions had deteriorated to the point that demolition and reconstruction were necessary. The reconstruction phases were analyzed by Nino Lamboglia through preserved municipal records. In December 1388, the city ordered a search for all previous bequests and available resources to fund the bell tower project. In July 1389, demolition began under Master Antonio de Francia, starting with a spire. Work then stalled, but in 1392 there was likely a sudden collapse, and on June 12, the council announced that the bell tower was destroyed and in ruins. Serafino Mignano and Antonio Campeggi were appointed to oversee the work.

Subsequent resolutions focused on the project: taxes were increased, and notaries were instructed to request bequests in wills for the bell tower. Work continued until the summer of 1393, but financial difficulties slowed progress, and the project was completed in 1398 with the construction of a balcony and a floor, likely the top floor of the tower.

From accounting records, it is evident that all citizens contributed to the construction of the new tower, either through voluntary donations or by paying taxes and fines. The role of the two overseers is unclear, although it seems that Mignano was both architect and contractor. The builders were the brothers Tomaso and Oberto Caressia, of Albenga origin and involved in all municipal works at the end of the 14th century. They requested a salary increase due to the difficulty of the work. The study does not attribute the design to a single figure, suggesting that the main actors likely outlined the guidelines, and the builders applied their own experience. Tomaso worked on cutting the bricks for the arches, but he died on December 18, 1392, with payment being collected by his brother, who completed the project. Giacomo di Como was also present but does not seem to have received recognition for his work, similar to Antonio da Gaeta. In the end, the magistri were paid for 290 days of work, with nearly half the sum going to the Caressia brothers. A master's daily wage was 9 soldi, while the matayrorio – those who mixed the lime – were paid 5 soldi per day. For 102 days of mason work, there were 249 days of laborer work. The workers came from Albenga, the Arroscia Valley, Voltri, Val Polcevera, Nice, and the Upper Tanaro Valley.

The materials used amounted to 24,500 bricks and 27 moggi of lime (one moggio equals 16 cantares, each weighing 150 pounds). The materials were local, with brick and lime supplied by Guglielmo Trucco and Giovanni Enrico from the Bastia kilns. Stones were rarely used and were sourced from Capo Mele to restore the old base. Stones from the Centa were also used for core masonry. Timber was of significant importance, used for scaffolding and centering. Three beams (trabes) came from Savona by ship, and other timber came from Finale Ligure. The scaffolding wood (canterii) was made of poplar or albara, while the planks were made of beech, poplar, fir, and chestnut, sourced from carpenters in the Arroscia Valley. The units of measurement for the timber were the canela (dozen). Among the supplies were containers such as bogliorii, segloni, concha de mata, barillarius, and coffe. Rope, tools like tongs, a large shovel, and two saws were also listed, although most craftsmen used their own tools. The registers also mention fornilia (kindling), tortorerii (ropes), and a guindacium (winch).

One of the most particular materials were seven small columns with their capitals, brought in by ship in various deliveries, likely to integrate those already present in the old bell tower. Wine was purchased in large quantities, as it was provided as part of the workers’ meals and as compensation. A total of 380 pints of wine were consumed for 351 workdays, roughly one pint per workday. Wine was measured using the scandalleum, divided into pints.

Final analysis shows that labor was the most significant cost. However, since there are no similar records like those from Albenga across Liguria, comparisons are difficult. The works were extensive, and the finished structure's appearance has remained largely intact to this day. Documentation regarding the spire is missing, which could have been built in the early 15th century. In the 17th century, a lightning strike caused minor damage to the bell tower, which was later repaired, and the bell system was refurbished in 1785, with the major bell recast and masonry work done in the bell chamber and the vault below. On June 5, 1882, lightning struck the bell tower, and in 1888, the pyramid was renewed with white, red, and green tiles, imitating the size and colors of the previous ones. The tiles were produced in Milan by Richard with materials sourced from England.

=== The New Choir ===
After the bell tower was completed, work began on the new choir, prompted by the municipality, as the church was considered to be in a state of significant disrepair. On April 13, 1399, the issue of the cathedral was raised for the first time in the municipal council, and by the end of May, the same body appointed two overseers, who, along with those of the cathedral, could recover the chapter’s debts to repair the church. The intentions of the bishop during these years are unknown, but it is notable that Gilberto Fieschi, who held the office from 1380 to 1419, governed only through vicars, leaving the cathedral chapter to freely negotiate with the municipality. Part of the roof over the choir was rebuilt, with the municipality granting safe passage to acquire abayni (slate tiles typical of Genoa) from the Riviera di Levante. Other transformations also took place, as evidenced by the sale of a column and timber by the cathedral to the municipality for the construction of the loggia in 1404. These works continued for several years, and in 1420, Pope Martin V granted Bishop Antonio Da Ponte the right to sell indulgences during feast days to help complete the construction.

Municipal accounting records show that from the 1479 taxes, a substantial sum of 500 lire was earmarked for Francesco Marchese, the cathedral overseer, provided that the chapter would double the amount invested in the cathedral. However, the municipality reserved the right to withdraw this sum if necessary, which happened in 1481 when defense works were built. In 1483, 160 lire and 18 soldi were allocated pro fabrica ecclesie Sancti Michealis (for the construction of Saint Michael’s Church). There was a need to rebuild the sacristy, as humidity was damaging the furniture and vestments, but the municipality disagreed, although it allocated 20 florins in 1489 for the project. The issue was discussed again in 1491 and 1499, but without success. From the Liber Massarie, we know that the municipality allocated modest funds, which were used to rebuild the door of Saint Veranus and the borchono magno (the window between the two pilasters on the facade, now walled up), where glass and netting were replaced in 1509, along with two windows in the Sancta Sanctorum, by the Benedictine friar Battista, master glassmaker. The portal of the facade was also rebuilt. Only in the second decade of the 16th century was the sacristy restored, with the chapter’s account of January 30, 1513, specifying pro fabrica sacristie magne et parve et camararum dicti capituli (for the construction of the large and small sacristies and the chapter rooms). The municipality contributed 500 lire, with the condition that the municipal coat of arms be displayed on the new construction. During the 1989 restoration, which brought the building back to its original state, two keystones were discovered on the top, one bearing the coat of arms of Bishop Marchese and the other that of the municipality.

The portico of the cathedral housed numerous tombs, as did the area between the cathedral and the baptistery and behind the main altar, where the cimiterium puerorum or paraize (paradise) was identified. The documentation also mentions the pigna, although it is unclear what or where this was. Under Napoleon Fieschi, a new altar dedicated to Saint Ampelius was created, and the relics of Saint Veranus were transferred in 1460. The noble family of Cepolla played a role in this renewed enthusiasm for the cult of Saint Veranus, establishing a new chaplaincy in 1488 with the municipality’s contribution of 80 lire for the laborerio troinarum Sancti Verani (the chapel of Saint Veranus), which took the form of an outbuilding within the side nave.

At the time, the city was divided into craft and trade guilds, the caritates, whose main purpose was to provide mutual assistance. Each of these guilds had a dedicated altar in the cathedral: the notaries were devoted to Saint Mark, the merchants to the Trinity, the goldsmiths and blacksmiths to Saints Eligius and Ampelius, the innkeepers and bakers to Saint Anthony, and the cobblers and tanners to Saints Crispin and Crispinian. During this period, the great organ required structural support to prevent its collapse, and in 1549, the chapter purchased a column that was demolished a century later. Thanks to numerous documentary sources, we know that there were many altars scattered throughout the side aisles, some enclosed by gates and elevated structures with colonnades and pediments, adorned with paintings and polyptychs. Although no frescoes survive, some are found behind the main altar and date to this period. Several tombs were located near the altars, near the main altar, in the middle of the church, or near the choir. Most of this artistic heritage was lost with the subsequent renovation carried out by Bishop Luca Fieschi.

=== The 16th Century Reconstruction ===
By the mid-1500s, the structures were in poor condition. In 1549, repairs were needed for the organ, and twenty years later, significant issues were reported in the chapel of Saint Veranus. In 1566, the chapter requested funds from the municipality, and Giacomo Salomonio noted that the vaults were severely damaged. The remains of Saint Veranus were moved to the sacristy, likely also damaged by the Centa River flood that year. The repairs began under Carlo Cicada, who also opened the Albenga seminary, and were completed under Luca Fieschi in 1583, as recorded on stone inscriptions from Finale. The intervention aimed not only to improve the appearance of the church but also to align it with conciliar norms. On January 8, 1569, a large gathering of the municipal council, called requixiti, was convened to decide whether the municipality was obligated to fund the repairs; the decision was negative. The bishop even wrote to the Holy See, asking it to urge the municipality to intervene, but for over a decade, nothing happened.

The municipality and district of Albenga were struggling financially, having lost the port and facing annual damage from the Centa River, which the municipality could not adequately mitigate. Undertaking the renovation of the cathedral was an economically prohibitive task for the municipal coffers. By 1573, the left wing of the cathedral was at risk of collapsing, and although the area contained the burials and altars of important families, they refused to take on the financial burden. In 1575, the Costa family finally agreed to rebuild the area between 1582 and 1585. Luca Fieschi was elected bishop of Albenga on March 28, 1582, and the municipal administration immediately wrote to congratulate him, pledging to find funds to complete the renovation. Work began on December 1, 1582, and was well-documented in the parish marriage register of San Michele by the cathedral’s archpriest. By 1584, the church was already functional enough to host the installation ceremony of the new podestà Tommaso Spinola, with the municipal council handling the reconstruction of benches for the authorities. Financial records show that Bishop Fieschi repeatedly helped with the project using his personal funds and also purchased some of the furnishings.

A detailed description of the church comes from Monsignor Niccolò Mascardi, who visited the diocese in 1585 and noted several details. The monument was still incomplete: the facade had two doors, a larger central one and a smaller one on the right nave. The bell tower did not yet have a door, which was only added later for symmetry with the three main entrances. The facade also had two windows: one semicircular (later sealed in the 19th century) and one oblong, located on the right nave. The church had two more doors, one on the west at Saint Veranus and one on the east, accessed through a dark and worn portico. Next to this door was the altar of the Holy Sepulcher, which was outside the church, facing the cemetery described as dilapidated. The external windows were large, and the apse had five upper square windows and three lower oblong ones. There were two sacristies: one for weekdays and the other for feast days. The larger one housed the municipal archive. The roof was made of wooden beams, and the vault was only present over the apse. The floor was made of lime, with brick flooring in the apse area, and there were 14 tombs inside the church. The bishop’s chair was placed to the left of the altar, while the bench for the city’s administrators was on the right.

Among the preserved furnishings is the tabernacle of the main altar. The Council of Trent had set guidelines for many sacred items, particularly the tabernacle. The construction of this tabernacle began in July 1582, led by the stewards of the Compagnia del Santissimo Sacramento. The company’s financial records show that the Genoese sculptor Domenico Liberante was chosen as the carver, and Battista Brignole as the gilder. The steward who carried out the order was Abbot Alessandro Costa, a refined art connoisseur. However, the tabernacle did not fully meet the conciliar requirements, and the bishop threatened to remove it. The matter was discussed in the municipal council, but in the end, the tabernacle remained and was embellished with two additional angels in 1590 by Prospero Cepolla and Pietro Adorno. It is known that the tabernacle remained in place until 1697, when a new one was made two years later, probably a monstrance crafted in Genoa by the goldsmiths Camillo De Ferrari and Sebastiano Dall’Isola.

A late 16th-century description mentions the presence of a new altar dedicated to Saint Richard, built at the expense of Bishop Luca Fieschi, replacing the old altar of Saint Stephen. The octagonal dome was already constructed, though still incomplete, and the altar did not yet comply with conciliar standards. The left end of the church had its masonry structures rebuilt between 1582 and 1583. The old structures were demolished, with records describing the removal of the vault (cubba) and walls, including the arch, columns, and window. Reconstruction was entrusted to the Savonese builder Nicolò Gamba.

The chapel of Saint Anthony was moved from the right nave to the counter-facade, next to the bell tower, where the Annunciation altar had previously stood. A new altar dedicated to Saint Mary Magdalene was built under the patronage of the Lamberti family, while an altar dedicated to the Three Wise Men had a short life. This period saw competition among the noble families of Albenga to enhance their family chapels.

Following Monsignor Mascardi’s visit, several liturgical and structural recommendations were made, including whitewashing the facade and painting an image of Saint Michael, opening a door for symmetry under the bell tower, fencing off the presbytery, installing iron grilles on the windows, constructing a pulpit, and repairing the organ in accordance with the Tridentine guidelines.

In 1586, the organ repairs were completed. The choir area was reorganized, with the stalls elevated on black stone steps at the bishop’s expense in September 1587. After the solemn consecration procession of the main altar, the chapel of Saint Richard was consecrated. The work was finished in 1589, with the addition of a canopy over the bishop’s chair and angels on the tabernacle in the 1590s. The following year, the bishop asked the patrons of the chapels to contribute to the construction of the cathedral’s vault, which was still made of wooden planks. The vault was completed in 1596, plastered after the installation of the choir windows commissioned by the municipality in 1593, which featured the municipal coat of arms in the stained glass. During these years, partial plastering was done on the facade, which was supposed to include an image of Saint Michael (no trace of it remains today), with nearby coats of arms of the bishop and the municipality, which also appeared on the cathedral’s marble facade. A report dated June 13, 1592, by Gerolamo de Puteo, canon of Santa Maria in Fontibus, noted that the cathedral had been at risk of collapse but had been “honorifically restored” thanks to the bishops' work. A visit to Rome by the canon of San Maurizio, Francesco Bruno, in 1594 revealed that the vault had been completed, the choir floor was made of octagonal slate slabs and marble squares, and the windows were fitted with stained glass and iron grilles.

Bishop Fieschi’s great work was honored with his burial in the chapel of Saint Richard, accompanied by an inscription, now preserved in the sacristy, which reads:

«D.O.M. Lucae Flisco Lavania comiti integ[erri]mo Albing[anensi] ep[iscop]o qui industria templum hoc cui XXVIII praefuit an[nis]. instaurandum epalles vero aedes augendas curavit. Septuagenarius obijt iv cal[endas] ian[uarias]. MDCX. Petrus Fran[ciscus]. Costa ep[iscop]us et civis hic iace[n]ti perpetuum posuit - MDCXXXIII»

=== From 1600 to 1900 ===
In the second decade of the 17th century, a new organ was installed above the bishop’s chair. In 1624, Bishop Landinelli resigned after a long absence from the diocese, and Pier Francesco Costa, a native of Albenga, was elected bishop, the first from Albenga since Leonardo Marchese 150 years earlier. Costa was a proactive bishop, overseeing the composition of the Sacro e Vago Giardininello and showing a passion for history. He also contributed to the construction of Villa Costa in Piambellino. With the cathedral already built, Costa focused on the interior, creating two new altars and a new high altar, consecrated on November 5, 1642, though their appearance is unknown today. He also redesigned the chapel dedicated to Saint Richard with new marble and columns and added two chapels dedicated to the Holy Spirit and Saint Philip Neri. Both the municipality and private citizens contributed to acquiring the marble portal, a project that lasted from 1669 to 1671. A few years later, the sacristy floors were redone in slate and small white marble tiles.

In 1691, Giorgio Spinola was elected bishop, and he made improvements to the central nave toward the end of the 17th century. From 1700 to 1703, the organ and its monumental case were moved from the Sancta Sanctorum to the counter-facade, with the large lunette being sealed. This configuration remained unchanged in the following centuries, as shown in 19th-century paintings. The large painting that had previously been in place was relocated to the Church of San Lorenzo. Two large marble modillions (brackets) were added to support the organ and choir, transported by sea from Finale Ligure to the city’s port and then to the cathedral.

After the organ was moved, the now-empty apse underwent a significant renovation. The old masonry traces were sealed, the capitals were redone, the walls plastered, and the wooden tabernacle was removed. In 1704, the new marble high altar was placed at the center of the Sancta Sanctorum, with a large wooden crucifix from Florence, donated by Pier Giovanni Lamberti and accepted by decree on April 28, 1706. The central vault was either reinforced or rebuilt, as it was demolished in 1706 and reconstructed in 1708 with funding from both the Curia and the municipality. In the 1770s, further work was done, including repairs to the cloister roof adjoining the right nave and some interior improvements, such as new capitals and enhancements to the pillars and walls.

The establishment of the Ligurian Republic in 1797 led to the partial devastation of the cathedral: the bishop's chair and choir were burned or destroyed, and Leonardo Marchese's tomb was desecrated. In the early 19th century, the orchestra was expanded, and the chair and choir were rebuilt in 1802 and 1804. In 1805, a project was initiated to marble the entire cathedral floor, carried out by Genoese marble worker Giovanni Barabino. Leonardo Marchese’s tomb was concealed, and a high gray marble base was constructed throughout the church. The chapel previously dedicated to the Holy Spirit, later to Saint Richard, and then to Saint Philip Neri, was also redone in the same marble. The funerary inscription dedicated to Tommaso Doria was removed and transferred to the municipal palace in 1806.

In 1813, Maurizio Carrega completed the decorations on the apse, and Giuseppe Crosonino painted the vault. For several decades, no major interventions were made, and the cathedral had a simple appearance, featuring a plastered, bright interior highlighted by the large apse fresco and marble altars.

A structural renovation was carried out on the corridor and sacristies, and two large marble altars were installed, brought from the convent of San Bernardino, which was municipal property, along with sculptures from the convent of San Francesco da Paola.

On June 5, 1882, lightning struck the spire of the bell tower, causing material to fall onto the roofs of the cathedral and the prefecture, damaging the roof, which had to be repaired. On February 23, 1887, a major earthquake caused significant damage to the city’s structures. The 16th-century lunette on the facade was sealed, and a new rose window was installed. The planned demolition of the 17th-century portal was stopped, and it was replaced by the one currently in Santa Maria in Fontibus. Inside, the decision was made to strip the columns down to bare stone and rebuild the pillars using brick and waterproof bridge cement to eliminate rising damp, a treatment that was also applied to the side facades. Significant painting work was carried out, and a new iron railing was installed in the choir. The church was solemnly reopened on September 29, 1892, with celebrations in honor of the patron saint.

=== Restoration and Consolidation Works ===
Interior restoration of the cathedral began in 1937, while as early as 1946, Nino Lamboglia proposed a recovery plan based on ideas from the late 19th century. In the summer of 1964, at the initiative of Bishop Gilberto Baroni from Emilia, a comprehensive study was undertaken to restore the medieval design of the structure. The project was led by engineer De Maestri, who oversaw both the static analysis and the construction work, under the strict supervision of the Genoa Superintendency, with architectural advice from Morozzo della Rocca and historical and archaeological guidance from Nino Lamboglia himself. The local company Formento from Finale Ligure carried out the work between 1965 and 1967, with the involvement of Bishop Alessandro Piazza, Baroni's apostolic successor. The restoration was supervised by the Ligurian Superintendency and the International Institute of Ligurian Studies.

The restoration aimed to recover the 13th-century medieval style, but the result was largely a reconstruction, creating a structure that only resembled what it would have looked like to a medieval visitor. Many elements from the 16th century were permanently lost during this intervention. Nonetheless, the craftsmanship and ability to recreate the medieval style resulted in a structure that closely mirrors the original.

Through studies and hypotheses, the medieval structures and their configurations were identified. The decision was made to restore and integrate the medieval elements while simultaneously consolidating the building, which had suffered structural damage over time and from earthquakes. When the polycentric arches were created in the 16th century, the walls above the original pointed arches were cut, and the columns were straightened without any reinforcement. The wedge stones that had been inserted under the pointed arches had lost their original structural function, which was to counteract the pressure of the arches and better distribute the loads onto the columns. Instead, these wedges exerted a spreading force on the masonry and compressed the narrower sections of the columns.

These structural issues were confirmed by tests on the building. Despite these deficiencies, the structure had held up well because the outer stone facing had only partially served a load-bearing function, with the internal brick masonry, built with good materials and techniques, bearing most of the load. Once the building was secured with temporary reinforcement, the original pointed arches were reconstructed with a reinforced concrete core, following the geometric outlines of the piers. The excavation continued until the medieval floor level was reached, and space was recovered for a Romanesque crypt beneath the presbytery.

Connections were made between the original walls and the reinforced concrete above the arches by inserting steel rods at a 45-degree angle. Pouring concrete into the formwork for the arches was a delicate operation, as there was a risk that the liquid concrete could exert excessive pressure that the masonry could not withstand. The effects of concrete shrinkage were minimized during the process. For the floor in the side aisles, blocks of unreinforced concrete were used in areas without historical significance, with a prefabricated floor laid on top to preserve the original early Christian floor. In the central nave, the challenge was to create a structure that would allow visitors to view the underlying early Christian remains. A floor was constructed, supported only by sections of free-standing walls and column bases. A pre-stressed reinforced concrete floor was laid perpendicular to the axis of the cathedral to avoid damaging the original squared stone plinths. Once again, only areas without historical or archaeological importance were used for support, and in some cases, they reached the natural ground. The pillars were constructed in a cross shape with inversely tapered arms to allow for greater light in the lower areas, minimizing the impact on the early Christian remains. The reduced distance due to the tapering allowed for thinner and lighter floors. This floor, with rhomboid-shaped coffers, was designed to have minimal bearing surface on the walls of the oldest apse, allowing for better load distribution and greater structural rigidity.

The static analysis of the bell tower, based on an older Romanesque tower rebuilt in 1392 and incorporated into the 13th-century structure, revealed that the tower was generally sound despite the heterogeneity of the materials. The foundations were also in good condition. However, crack analysis showed that at a height of 18 meters above the square, cracks had formed due to the horizontal thrust of the spire and the dynamic vibrations of the bells. These cracks had caused the walls to shift and begin opening outward. To address this, reinforced concrete tie beams were installed to encircle and reinforce the structure.

=== Considerations ===
The use of reinforced concrete in such a delicate restoration project, aimed at presenting the structure as it appeared in the 13th century, represented an innovation in the field of conservation and restoration. Altering the structural elements with contemporary technologies was a necessary compromise, as other techniques would have had a more significant impact on the integrity of the structure. The operations allowed for the introduction of several new elements, albeit with a focus on essentiality. Additionally, the static stabilization of the structure was both appropriate and efficient, ensuring the preservation of the cathedral while respecting its historical significance.

== Structure ==
The cathedral is today divided into a nave and two aisles with the original columns and pillars supporting ogival arches. Interventions by Nino Lamboglia also allowed the deletion of the elements baroque from sanctuary, now raised to liturgical requirements and to make the proto-Romanesque crypt more visible.

The various structural stages that followed are clearly visible in the outside facade, which shows a rose window and decoration arches. The adjacent bell tower was rebuilt between 1391 and 1395 by the architect-canonical Serafino Mignano with the help of master builders Oberto and Tommaso Caressia. An example of Late Gothic architecture, it has five rows of mullioned windows culminating with a polygonal cusp featuring pinnacles at the four corners.

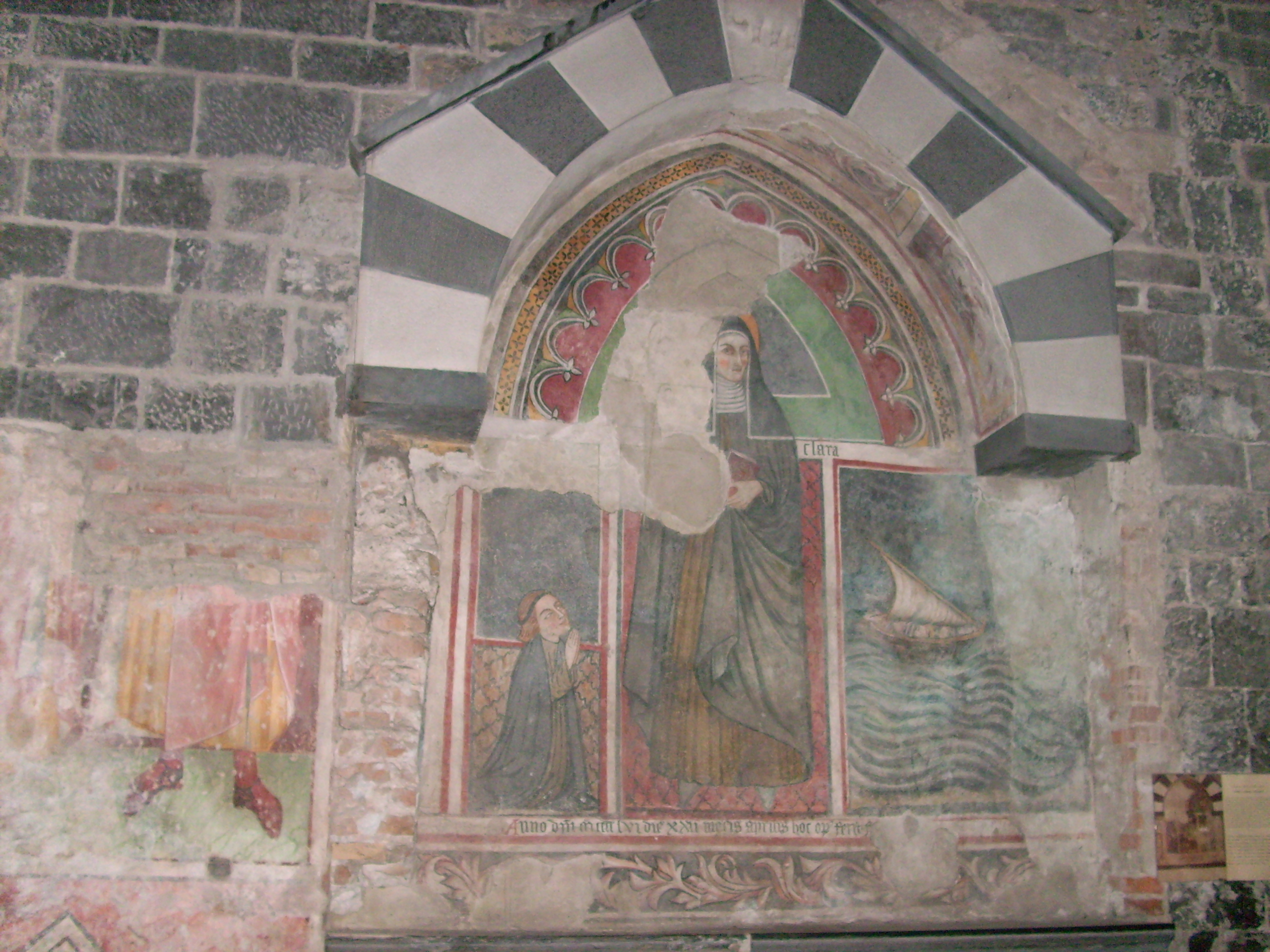
Fresco of Saint Clare

== Sources and external links ==
- Diocese of Albenga-Imperia website (in Italian)
- SBAPGE website: Albenga Cathedral (in Italian)
- Provincia Savona website: Cattedrale di San Michele (in Italian)
