= Hôtel de Ville, Cavaillon =

Town hall in Cavaillon, France

Hôtel de Ville
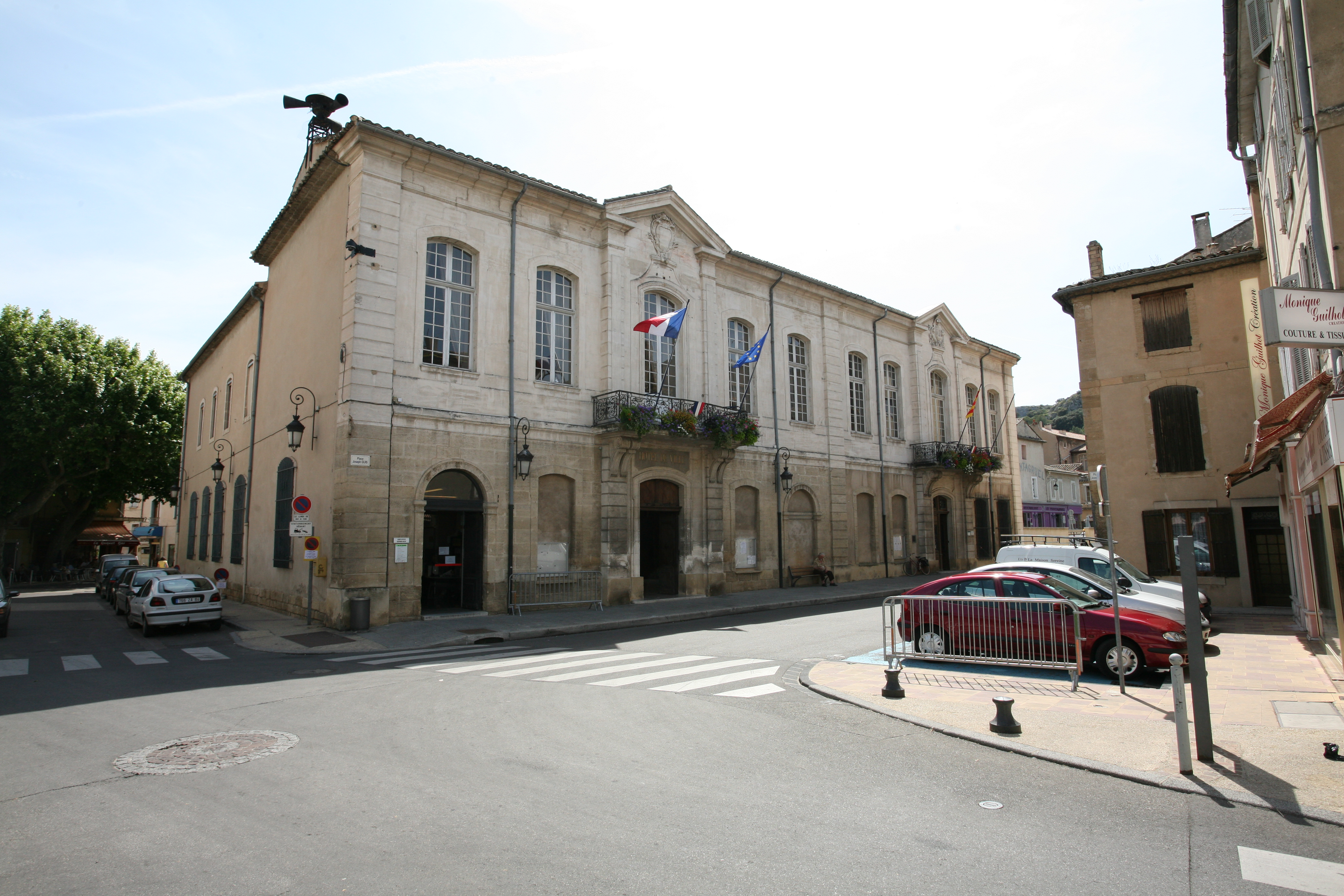
- The main frontage of the Hôtel de Ville in May 2009
- Interactive map of the Hôtel de Ville area

General information
- Type: City hall
- Architectural style: Neoclassical style
- Location: Cavaillon, France
- Coordinates: 43.8355°N 5.0376°E
- Completed: 1753

Design and construction
- Architect: Joseph-Abel Mottard

The Hôtel de Ville (French pronunciation: [otɛl də vil], City Hall) is a municipal building in Cavaillon, Vaucluse, in southeastern France, standing on Place Joseph Guis. It has been included on the Inventaire général des monuments by the French Ministry of Culture since 1986.

== History ==
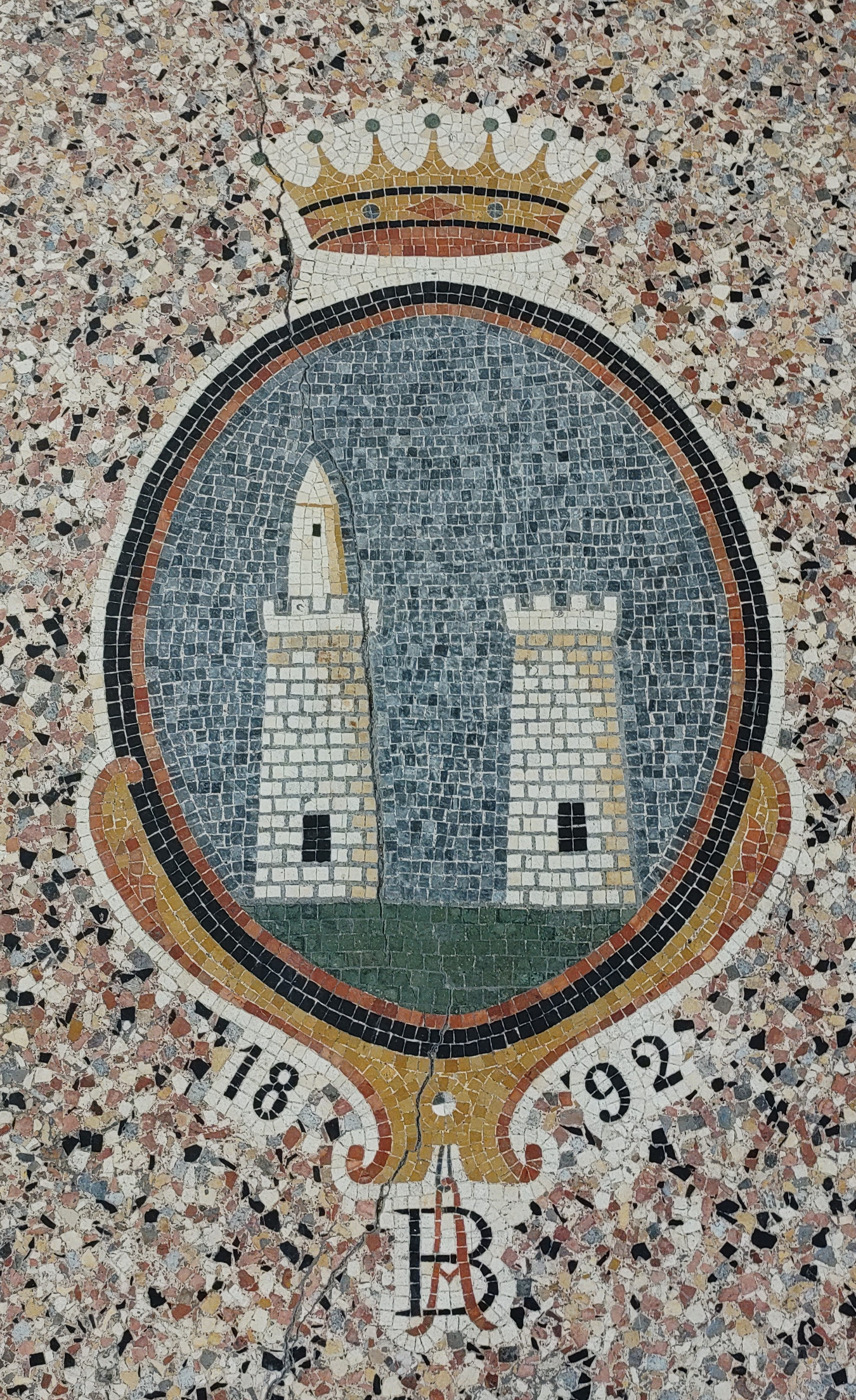
Floor mosaic in the building

The building was commissioned by the consuls of Cavaillon with the approval of the Archbishop of Avignon, François-Marie de Manzi, in 1749. The site they selected had been occupied by a medieval town hall and, before that, by the Château of the Viscounts of Cavaillon. The building was a typical hôtel particulier with a grand gate, a grand courtyard and two ornate façades. Construction of the new building started in 1750. It was designed by Joseph-Abel Mottard in the neoclassical style, built in ashlar stone and was completed in 1753. The design involved a symmetrical north-facing façade of five bays facing onto Place Joseph Guis. The central bay, which was slightly projected forward, featured a segmental headed doorway on the ground floor, and a segmental headed French door with a balcony on the first floor. The central bay was flanked by full-height banded pilasters supporting an open pediment with a shield in the tympanum. The outer bays contained round headed doorways on the ground floor and segmental headed windows on the first floor; the second and fourth bays were fenestrated in a similar style.

In the mid-18th century, the writer, Eusèbe Girault de Saint-Fargeau, observed that the town hall was the only building in the town which deserved "mention particulière" (special mention). The building was restored by a local contractor, Charles Vidau, in 1892. The improvements included fine floor mosaics in the Salle des Pas Perdus (the room of lost steps) as well as other refurbishment works.

Between 1895 and 1897, a glass roof was added to the courtyard behind the building. Then, in 1899, the council extended the main frontage to the west by acquiring additional buildings. These additional buildings were subsequently given a new façade, which was designed in the same style and also extended for five bays, so providing symmetry in relation to the original section.

In April 1981, the future president of France, François Mitterrand, visited the town and was received by the mayor, Fernand Lombard, and civic officials in the town hall. Then, in July 2006, the building was the venue for a ceremony in which a local farm worker, Virginie Gambet, was posthumously awarded the honour of Righteous Among the Nations by the State of Israel for protecting a family of Jewish people in the town during the Second World War.
