= Prissé =

- Commune
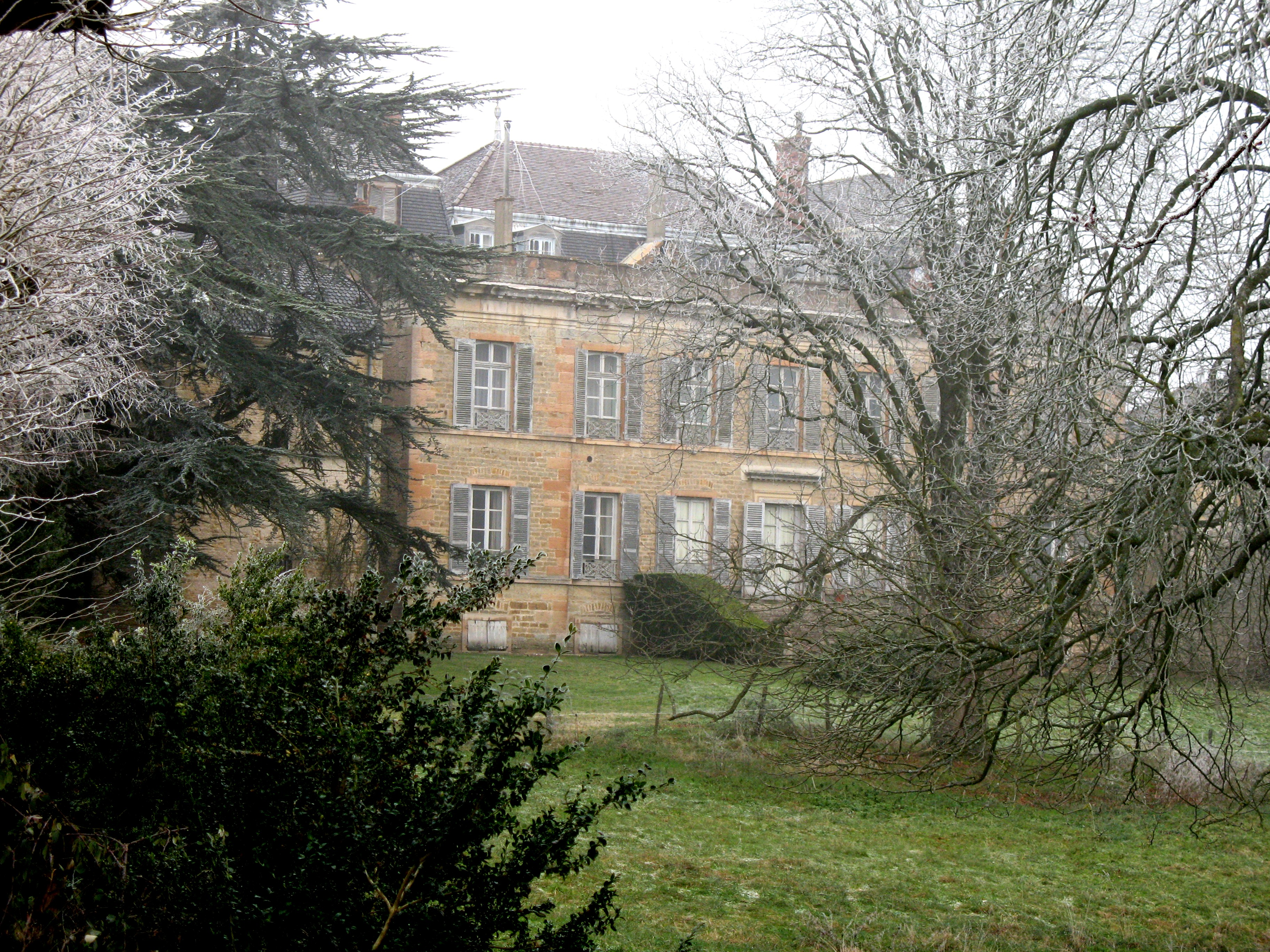
- Chateau of La Combe

- Coat of arms
- Location of Prissé
- Location within France Location within Bourgogne-Franche-Comté
- Coordinates: 46°19′17″N 4°44′40″E
- Country: France
- Region: Bourgogne-Franche-Comté
- Department: Saône-et-Loire
- Arrondissement: Mâcon
- Canton: Hurigny
- Intercommunality: Mâconnais Beaujolais Agglomération
- Area^{1}: 10.85 km^{2} (4.19 sq mi)
- Elevation: 205 m (673 ft)
- Highest elevation: 401 m (1,316 ft)
- Lowest elevation: 192 m (630 ft)
- Population (2023): 1,898
  - Density: 174.9/km^{2} (453.1/sq mi)
- Time zone: UTC+01:00 (CET)
  - Summer (DST): UTC+02:00 (CEST)
- INSEE/Postal code: 71360 /71960
- ^{1} French Land Register data, which excludes lakes, ponds, glaciers > 1 km^{2} (0.386 sq mi or 247 acres) and river estuaries.

Prissé (French pronunciation: [pʁise]) is a commune in the Saône-et-Loire department in the region of Bourgogne-Franche-Comté in eastern France.

== See also ==
- Communes of the Saône-et-Loire department
- Saint-Véran AOC
