= Basitony =

Basitony (from the Greek words básis (βάσις) - pedestal, and tonos (τόνος) - tension) is the predominant or exclusive development of buds at the base of a plant or branch.

It is the tendency of some plants to preferentially supply sap to branches located at the base of the stem, thereby favoring the growth of the lowest axillary buds. Consequently, secondary branches become more numerous and larger toward the base of the stem and the lowest primary branches (resulting in a shrubby growth habit).

This branching pattern—governed by the phenomenon of apical dominance, which regulates the relative development of terminal buds—is the opposite of "acrotony", a characteristic of tree-like growth forms. Many intermediate variations can also be observed.

The hazel tree, for example, exhibits this pattern.
