= Saint-Véran AOC =

Saint-Véran
- Wine region
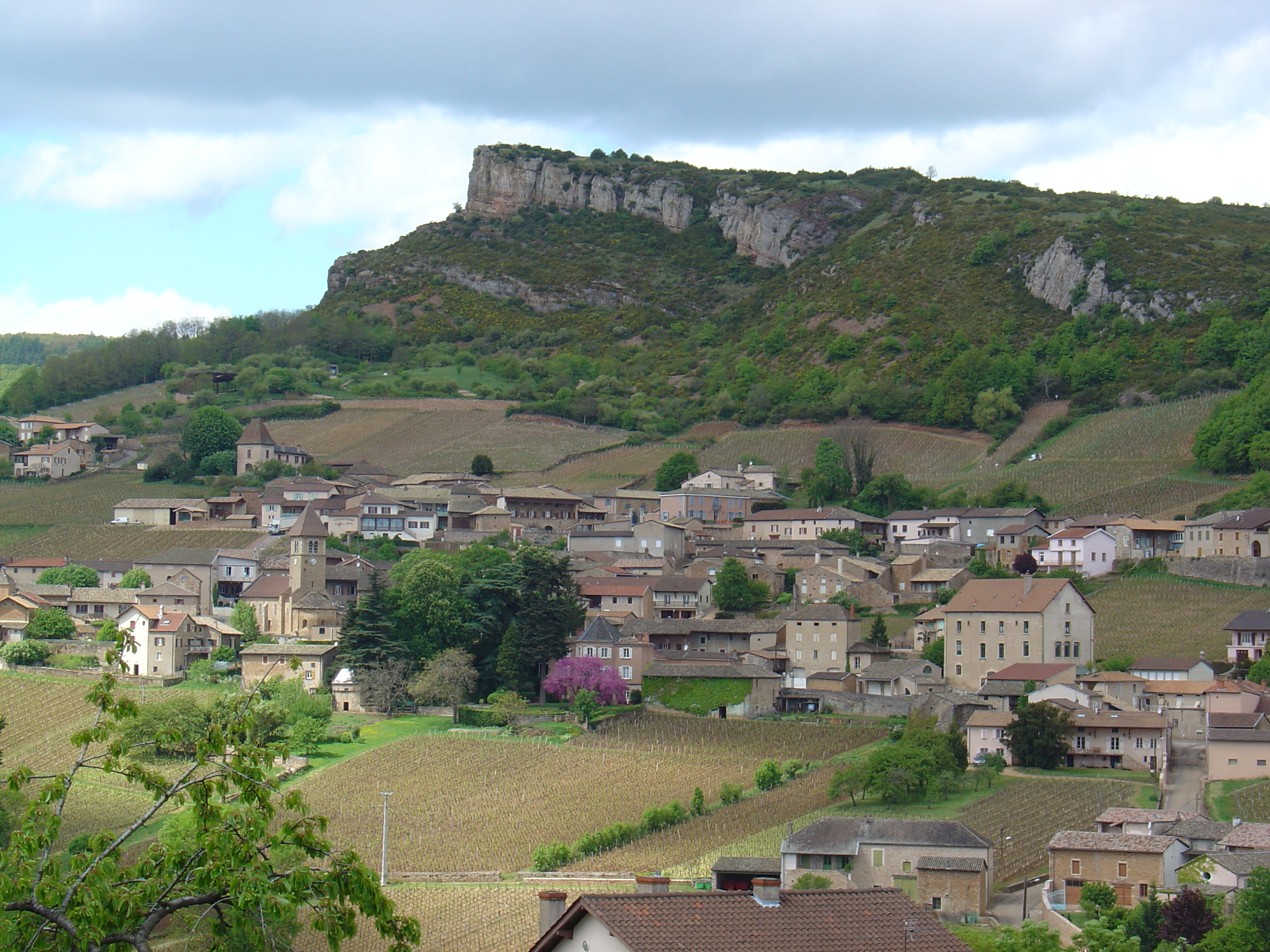
- Type: AOC
- Year established: 1971
- Country: France
- Climate region: continental
- Size of planted vineyards: 680 ha (1,700 acres)
- No. of vineyards: 1
- Grapes produced: Chardonnay

Saint-Véran is an Appelation d'Origine Contrôlée (AOC) for white Burgundy wine from the Mâconnais subregion, located in the department of Saône-et-Loire. It is named after the commune of Saint–Vérand.

== Geographical description ==
The geographical area of this appellation extends over 8 communes and is divided into two small islands separated from each other by the Pouilly-Fuissé appellation. It is made up of the villages of Davayé, Prissé and Solutré-Pouilly in the north, and Chânes, Chasselas, Leynes, Saint-Amour and Saint-Vérand in the south. All these villages are located in the extreme south of the Mâconnais subregion and of the Burgundy wine region as a whole.

== Historical background ==
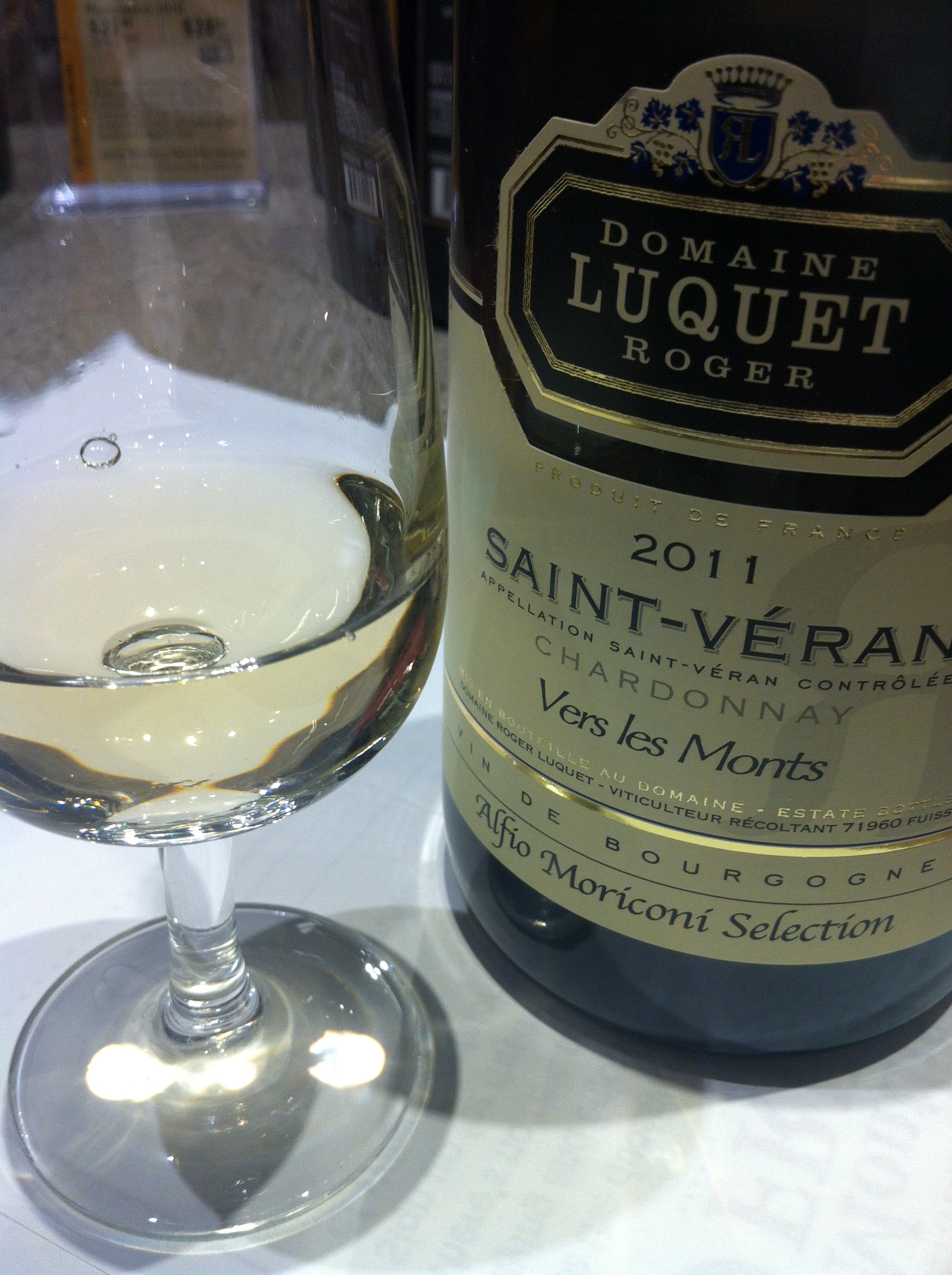
A Chardonnay from Saint-Véran

The Saint-Véran appellation came into being on January 6, 1971. An enthronement ceremony was held at the Château de la Balmondière in Saint Vérand.

The AOC wine produced by the 6 Mâconnais communes of Chânes, Chasselas, Davayé, Leynes, Prissé, and Saint-Vérand was christened "Saint-Véran" (without a final 'd'), the old spelling of the village's name.

== Vineyards ==
=== Features ===
- Grape varieties grown: Saint-Véran wines are produced entirely from Chardonnay grapes.
- Pruning: The pruning method known as "taille à queue du Mâconnais" (lit. Maconnais tail pruning) is typical of the Maconnais district and is a variation on Guyot pruning. This technique of bending of the wood into an arc during pruning is designed to prevent acrotony, a characteristic defect of Chardonnay vines, and also serves to protect the plants against spring frosts.
- Surface area of land under production: The Saint-Veran appellation covers 680 hectares (1,700 acres) of land and produces 39,030 hectolitres of wine.
- Maximum yield: 55 hectolitres/hectare.

=== Geology and terroirs ===
From north to south, the terroir (soil type, climate and wine-growing tradition) of Saint-Véran borders directly on that of its neighbour, the Pouilly-Fuissé appellation, and together they share soils that are a mixture of chalk and clay. The area ranges in altitude from 250 to 450 metres (820 to 1,480 ft). The south-south-east-facing slopes that enjoy the most sunshine.

=== Named vineyards ===
Le Clos, Au Château, les Peiguins, Au Bourg, A la Croix, Aux Bulands and Vers le Mont are the climats/lieux-dits (specific named vineyards) with the most desirable micro-climates, and which are sometimes indicated on the labels together with the name Saint-Véran.

=== Wine type, gastronomical features and serving temperatures ===
It is a pale golden colour when young, taking on a rich amber hue over time and often improving with age. Wine connoisseurs appreciated Saint-Veran's qualities before the appellation was officially recognized. Depending on the year and the batch, the wine has been noted to have fruity notes of white peach, apple or pear, or floral notes of lime-blossom or acacia that give way, over time, to notes of hazelnut or almond, offset by delicate touches of honey, vanilla and flint. Experts recommend it be matched with chicken in a cream sauce, veal sweetbreads or fish. Saint-Véran should be served at around 11 °C (52 °F) and is best opened a few minutes before being served.
