= Luc Bulot =

French palaeontologist (1963–2022)

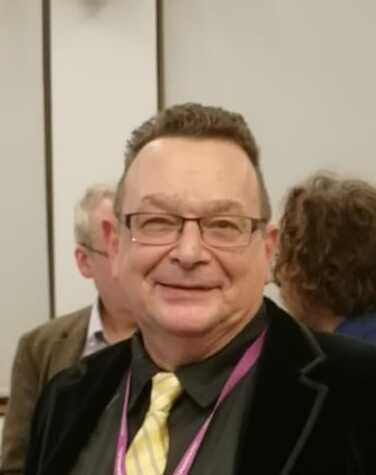
- Bulot in 2019
- Born: July 23, 1963; Cavaillon, France
- Died: July 27, 2022 (aged 59); Manchester, United Kingdom
- Scientific career
- Fields: Biostratigraphy, Plate tectonics
- Workplaces: National Museum of Natural History, Aix-Marseille University, University of Manchester
- Thesis: (1995)

Luc Bulot (July 23, 1963 – July 27, 2022) was a French paleontologist mainly known for his work on the biostratigraphy of West Africa and on the determination of Lower Cretaceous GSSP.

== Personal life ==
Luc Georges Bulot was born in Cavaillon, Vaucluse, France on July 23, 1963.

On October 17, 2015, he married Elsa Schnebelen in Saint-Privat-de-Champclos (Gard).

== Career ==
Bulot graduated with a master's degree in geology from the University of Dijon and obtained a PhD at the National Museum of Natural History of Paris in 1995.

Chairman of the "Working group on the Valanginian" within the International Commission on Stratigraphy, he worked for a long time on the definition of the Lower Cretaceous GSSP.

From 2020 to 2022, he held various simultaneous positions: lead biostratigraphy expert within the North Africa Research Group, co-leader of an LCO/IFREMER/CNRS consortium based in Brest and investigating the links between biostratigraphy, sedimentology and plate tectonics, lecturer at the University of Manchester; and editor of the Arabian Journal of Geosciences (AJGS).

Notable areas of work included:

- Reconstruction of the Mesozoic paleogeography of Provence.
- Definition of the marine biostratigraphic framework of West Africa.
- Definition of Cretaceous stage limits (for the International Chronostratigraphic Chart) leading in particular to the definition of the GSSP of the Valanginian-Hauterivian transition at La Charce.
- Discovery of new species of ammonites.

== Death and tributes ==
In July 2022, Luc Bulot died of cancer in Manchester, United Kingdom at the age of 59.

In 2023, many researchers paid tribute, in a special edition of the Journal of African Earth Science, to the extent of his work which redefined a significant part of the stratigraphy of West Africa.
