= Veranus of Cavaillon =

Bishop of Cavaillon and saint (d. c. 590)

Saint Veranus
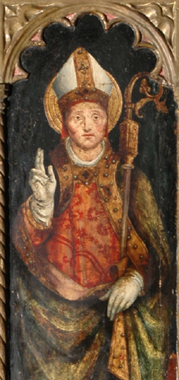
- Saint Veranus is represented with episcopal vestments in the traditional posture of a bishop-saint blessing, with his crozier and mitre.

Bishop
- Died: c. 590
- Venerated in: Roman Catholic Church
- Feast: October 19
- Attributes: episcopal attire

Saint Veranus of Cavaillon (French: Véran, Vrain; Italian: Verano) (died c. 590) was a French saint, with a cultus in Italy. He was born at Vaucluse and was bishop of Cavaillon.

Gregory of Tours writes of miracles performed by Veranus, including the expulsion of a dragon. He is also remembered as a leader in charitable works and as a patron of local monasteries, not only in France but also in Italy, particularly in the city of Albenga, where he was instrumental in the conversion of the people to Christianity.

In the early 11th century, some of his relics were transferred from his place of burial to Orléans. In the 13th century, most were transferred again, to Cavaillon Cathedral, which is dedicated to him, but some were sent to Albenga Cathedral in Liguria, where they are still preserved in a shrine.

== Placenames ==
The French villages of Saint-Véran and Saint-Verain are named after him.

In Fontaine de Vaucluse, there is a church named after the saint. It was the place of his birth and in the small church there is a tomb reputed to be his.

== See also ==
- Veranus of Vence
