= Bulbophyllum leucorhodum =

Scientific classification
- Kingdom: Plantae
- Clade: Tracheophytes
- Clade: Angiosperms
- Clade: Monocots
- Order: Asparagales
- Family: Orchidaceae
- Subfamily: Epidendroideae
- Genus: Bulbophyllum
- Species: B. leucorhodum

Binomial name
- Bulbophyllum leucorhodum Schltr.

Species of plant

Bulbophyllum leucorhodum is a species of orchid in the genus Bulbophyllum. It was described by Schltr. in 1913. The orchid is a small-sized epiphytic orchid native to New Guinea, thrives in range forests at elevations around 1000 meters. Its close-set, conical-cylindrical pseudobulbs support a single, apical, erect, ligulate leaf that is obtuse at the apex and narrows towards the base, forming a subpetiolate structure. This warm to cool-growing orchid blooms in the later fall and winter, producing a single flower on an erect, very short, single-flowered inflorescence.

== Bibliography ==
- The Bulbophyllum-Checklist
- The Internet Orchid Species Photo Encyclopedia
