= Apical dominance =

Phenomenon where the central stem grows stronger than other stems

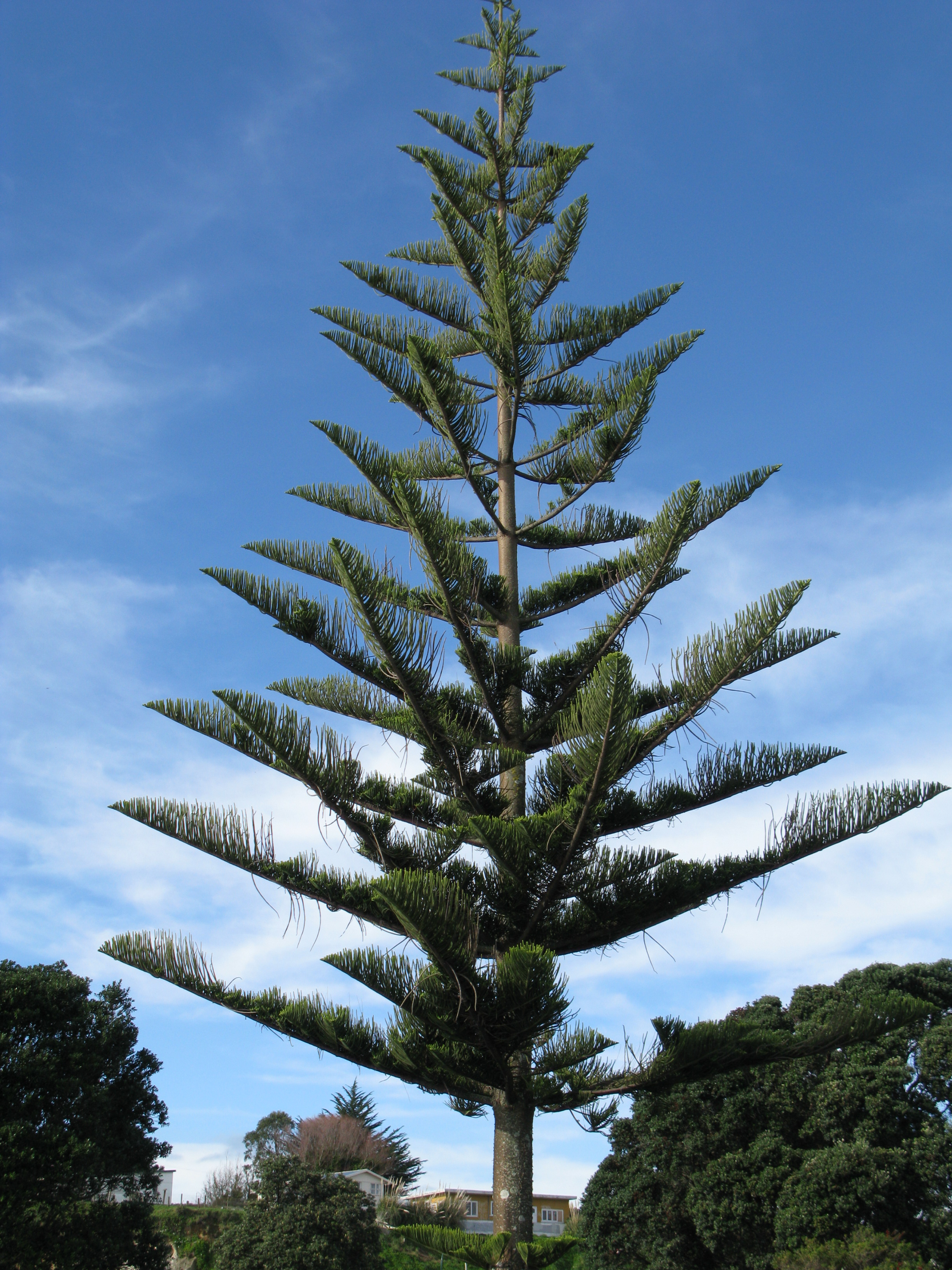
Many conifers show particularly strong apical dominance, strongest of all being in the family Araucariaceae, showing a single erect central trunk with strongly differentiated horizontal branching. Cuttings of Araucariaceae species taken from a side branch will not develop erect growth. Araucaria heterophylla, New Zealand.

In botany, apical dominance is the phenomenon whereby the main, central stem of the plant is dominant over (i.e., grows more strongly than) other side stems; on a branch the main stem of the branch is further dominant over its own side twigs.

Plant physiology describes apical dominance as the control exerted by the terminal bud (and shoot apex) over the outgrowth of lateral buds.

== Overview ==
Apical dominance occurs when the shoot apex inhibits the growth of lateral buds so that the plant may grow vertically. It is important for the plant to devote energy to growing upward so that it can get more light to undergo photosynthesis. If the plant utilizes available energy for growing upward, it may be able to outcompete other individuals in the vicinity. Plants that were capable of outcompeting neighboring plants likely had higher fitness. Apical dominance is therefore most likely adaptive.

Typically, the end of a shoot contains an apical bud, which is the location where shoot growth occurs. The apical bud produces a plant hormone, auxin (IAA), that inhibits growth of the lateral buds further down on the stem towards the axillary bud. Auxin is predominantly produced in the growing shoot apex and is transported throughout the plant via the phloem and diffuses into lateral buds which prevents elongation. That auxin likely regulates apical dominance was first discovered in 1934.

When the apical bud is removed, the lowered IAA concentration allows the lateral buds to grow and produce new shoots, which compete to become the lead growth.

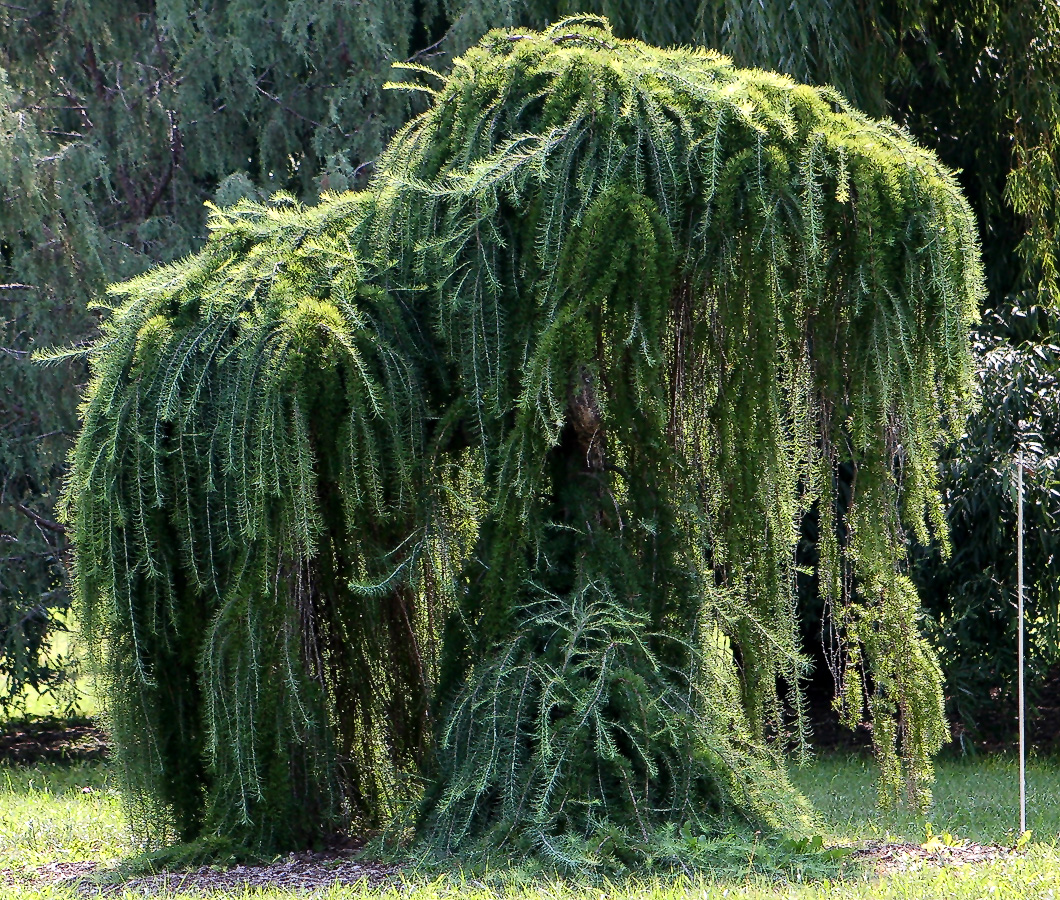
Weeping larch showing growth habit lacking apical dominance

== Variation ==
The manifestation of apical dominance differs significantly between plant groups due to the positioning of their growing points (meristems):

- Broadleaf plants: The apical meristem is located at the shoot tip, elevated above the ground. Apical dominance is exerted downward, inhibiting axillary buds along the stem. Removing the apex (pruning) releases these buds, resulting in lateral branching and a bushier shape.
- Grasses: During vegetative growth, the primary apical meristem remains at or near the soil surface in a region called the crown. Growth occurs via intercalary meristems at the base of the leaves. Apical dominance in grasses primarily regulates tillering—the production of new shoots from basal buds. Because the meristem is protected at ground level, grasses can be mown or grazed without destroying the primary growing point, allowing them to recover more quickly than most broadleaf species.

== Apex removal ==
Plant physiologists have identified four different stages the plant goes through after the apex is removed (Stages I-IV). The four stages are referred to as:

1. lateral bud formation
2. "imposition of inhibition" (apical dominance)
3. initiation of lateral bud outgrowth following decapitation
4. elongation and development of the lateral bud into a branch

These stages can also be defined by the hormones that are regulating the process which are as follows: Stage I, cytokinin promoted, causing the lateral bud to form since cytokinin plays a role in cell division; Stage II, auxin is promoted, resulting in apical dominance ("imposition of inhibition"); Stage III, cytokinin released resulting in outward growth of the lateral bud; and Stage IV, auxin is decreased and gibberellic acid is promoted which results in cell division, enabling the bud or branch to continue outward growth.

More simply stated, lateral bud formation is inhibited by the shoot apical meristem (SAM). The lateral bud primordium—from which the lateral bud develops—is located below SAM. The shoot tip rising from the SAM inhibits the growth of the lateral bud by repressing auxin. When the shoot is cut off, the lateral bud begins to lengthen which is mediated by a release of cytokinin. Once the apical dominance has been lifted from the plant, elongation and lateral growth is promoted and the lateral buds grow into new branches. When lateral bud formation prevents the plant from growing upward, it is undergoing lateral dominance. Often, lateral dominance can be triggered by decapitating the SAM or artificially decreasing the concentration of auxin in plant tissues.

== Applications ==
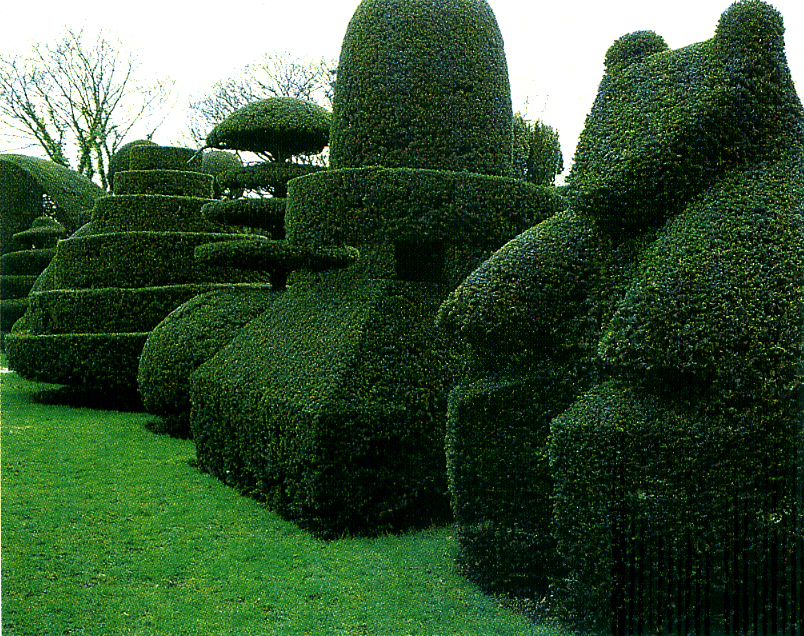
When apical meristems (apical buds) are continually removed, the shape of a tree or shrub can be manipulated significantly, because newer, uninhibited, branches grow en masse almost anywhere on the tree or shrub. Topiary garden, Beckley Park manor, UK

When the apical bud is removed, the lowered IAA concentration allows the lateral buds to grow and produce new shoots, which compete to become the lead growth. Pruning techniques such as coppicing and pollarding make use of this natural response to curtail direct plant growth and produce a desired shape, size, and/or productivity level for the plant. The principle of apical dominance is manipulated for espalier creation, hedge building, or artistic sculptures called topiary. If the SAM is removed, it stimulates growth in the lateral direction. By careful pruning, it is possible to create remarkable designs or patterns.

Some fruit trees have strong apical dominance, and young trees can become "leggy", with poor side limb development. Apical dominance can be reduced in this case, or in cases where limbs are broken off by accident, by cutting off the auxin flow above side buds that one wishes to stimulate. This is often done by orchardists for young trees.

Occasionally, strong apical dominance is advantageous, as in the "Ballerina" apple trees. These trees are intended to be grown in small gardens, and their strong apical dominance combined with a dwarfing rootstock gives a compact narrow tree with very short fruiting side branches.

== See also ==
- Meristem
- Fruit tree pruning
- Basitony
- Acrotony
