= Calocerus =

2nd-century Christian martyr

Saint Calocerus

Martyr
- Died: 130; Albenga, Italy
- Venerated in: Roman Catholic Church, Eastern Orthodox Church
- Canonized: Pre-congregation
- Major shrine: cathedral of Albenga
- Feast: 18 April (Roman Catholic Church); 19 May (Eastern Orthodox)
- Attributes: depicted as a Roman soldier

Saint Calocerus (Italian: Caio, Calocero, Calogero) was a 2nd-century Christian martyr. His alleged "acts" belong to a much later period.

== Narrative ==
He was probably an officer in the Roman army under the Roman emperor Hadrian and was stationed in Brescia in Lombardy, Italy. His life and legend are associated with Saints Faustinus and Jovita, and according to tradition, all three saints were soldiers from Brescia. The constancy of Faustinus and Jovita led to the conversion of Calocerus, who in turn converted Secundus of Asti.

According to tradition, Calocerus preached at Albenga and was martyred in this town.

== Veneration ==
A local cult devoted to Calocerus was limited to the dioceses of Brescia, Milan, Asti, Ivrea and Tortona. The cathedral of Albenga, built in the fourth and fifth centuries, was dedicated to him. The alleged tomb of Saint Calocerus is conserved in the Civic Museum at Albenga. The cathedral of Albenga contains an urn with some of his relics.
