= Cavaillon Cathedral =

Former Roman Catholic church in France

Coordinates: 43°50′10″N 5°2′11″E

Cavaillon Cathedral Cathédrale Notre-Dame-et-Saint-Véran de Cavaillon
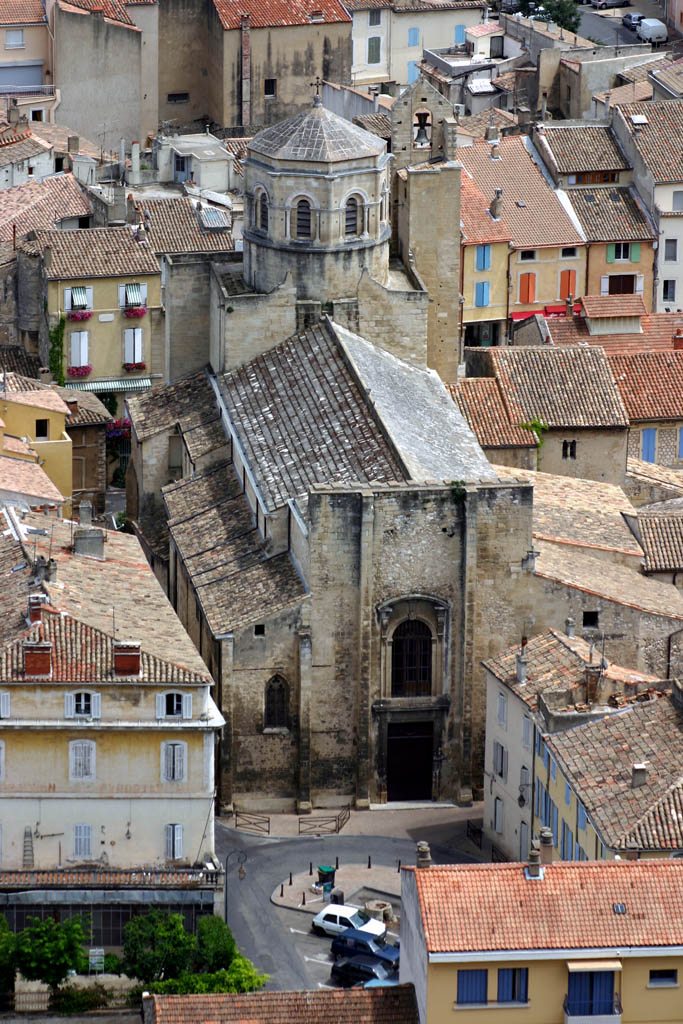
- Cavaillon Cathedral

Religion
- Affiliation: Roman Catholic Church
- Province: Bishop of Cavaillon
- Region: Vaucluse
- Rite: Roman
- Ecclesiastical or organisational status: Cathedral
- Status: Active

Location
- Location: Cavaillon, France
- Interactive map of Cavaillon Cathedral; Cathédrale Notre-Dame-et-Saint-Véran de Cavaillon

Architecture
- Type: church
- Style: Romanesque

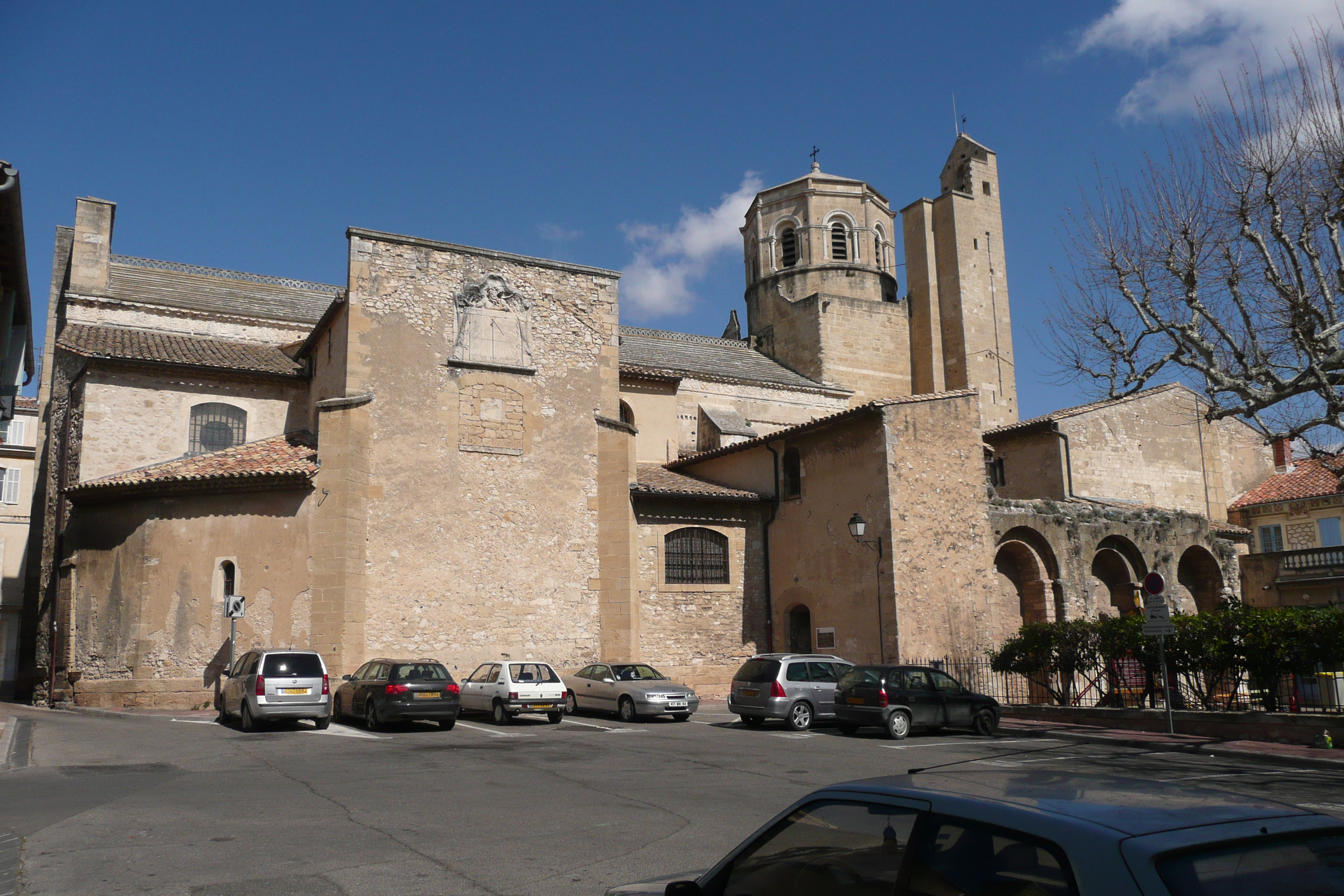
Cavaillon Cathedral

Cavaillon Cathedral (Cathédrale Notre-Dame-et-Saint-Véran de Cavaillon) is a former Roman Catholic church located in the town of Cavaillon, Vaucluse, France. It is in the Romanesque architectural style, built in the 11th–13th century.

The cathedral is a national monument. Until the French Revolution, it was the seat of the Bishop of Cavaillon. The diocese was abolished by the Concordat of 1801 and annexed to the Diocese of Avignon.

It is classified under historical monuments by the 1840 list.
