= Saint-Vérand, Saône-et-Loire =

Saint-Vérand
- Commune
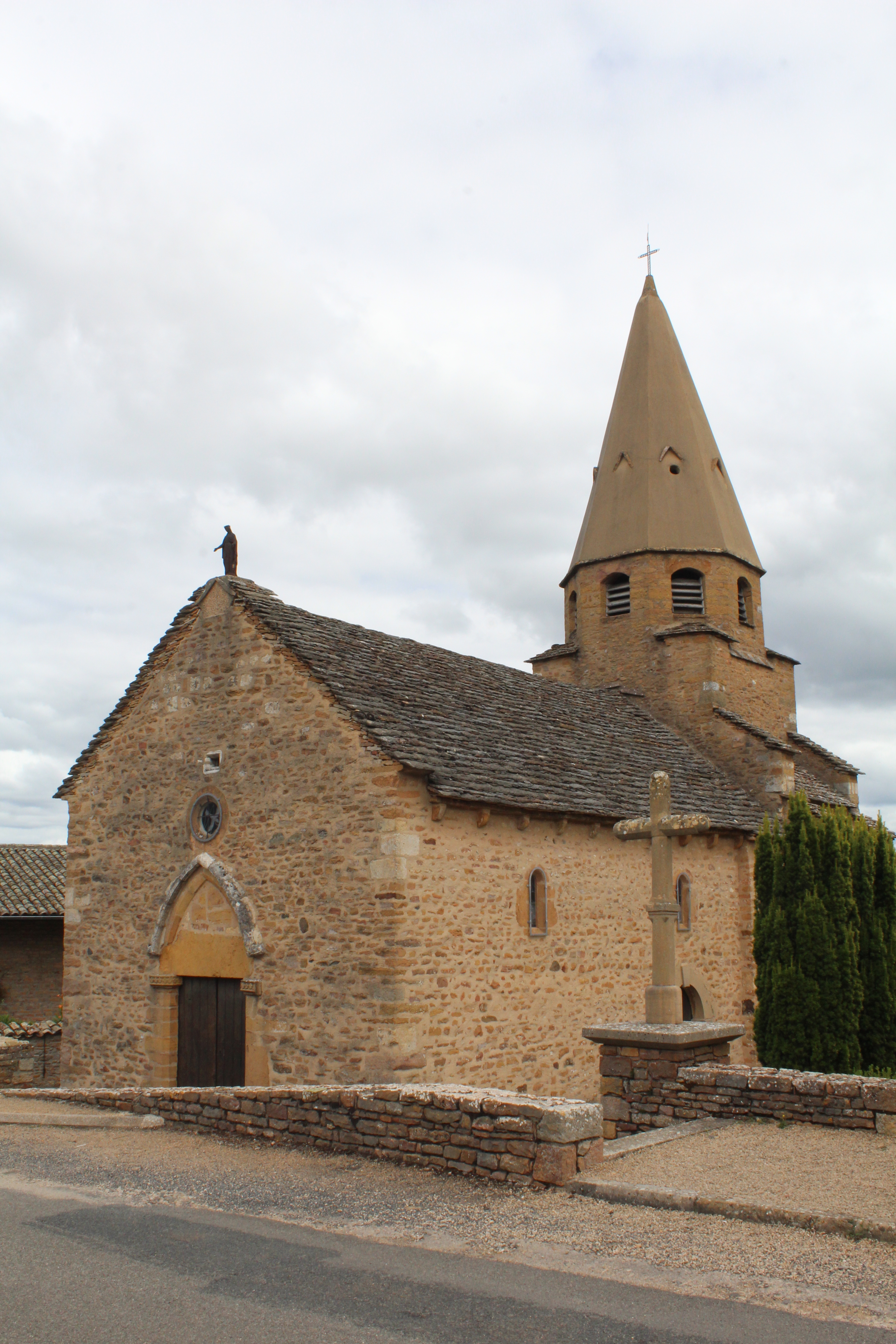
- The church in Saint-Vérand

- Coat of arms
- Location of Saint-Vérand
- Location within France Location within Bourgogne-Franche-Comté
- Coordinates: 46°15′19″N 4°44′10″E
- Country: France
- Region: Bourgogne-Franche-Comté
- Department: Saône-et-Loire
- Arrondissement: Mâcon
- Canton: La Chapelle-de-Guinchay
- Intercommunality: Mâconnais Beaujolais Agglomération
- Area^{1}: 2.45 km^{2} (0.95 sq mi)
- Elevation: 350 m (1,150 ft)
- Highest elevation: 475 m (1,558 ft)
- Lowest elevation: 220 m (720 ft)
- Population (2023): 155
  - Density: 63.3/km^{2} (164/sq mi)
- Time zone: UTC+01:00 (CET)
  - Summer (DST): UTC+02:00 (CEST)
- INSEE/Postal code: 71487 /71570
- ^{1} French Land Register data, which excludes lakes, ponds, glaciers > 1 km^{2} (0.386 sq mi or 247 acres) and river estuaries.

Saint-Vérand (French pronunciation: [sɛ̃ veʁɑ̃]) is a commune in the Saône-et-Loire department in the region of Bourgogne-Franche-Comté in eastern France.

== Wine ==
After the Revolution of 1789, the commune decided on the name Saint Vérand with a "d" at the end, following an administrative error. Saint-Vérand and surrounding communes produce white Burgundy wine under the appellation Saint-Véran, using Saint-Véran's old spelling, without 'd'.

== See also ==
- Communes of the Saône-et-Loire department
