= Roman Catholic Diocese of Cavaillon =

Coordinates: 43.84°N 5.04°E

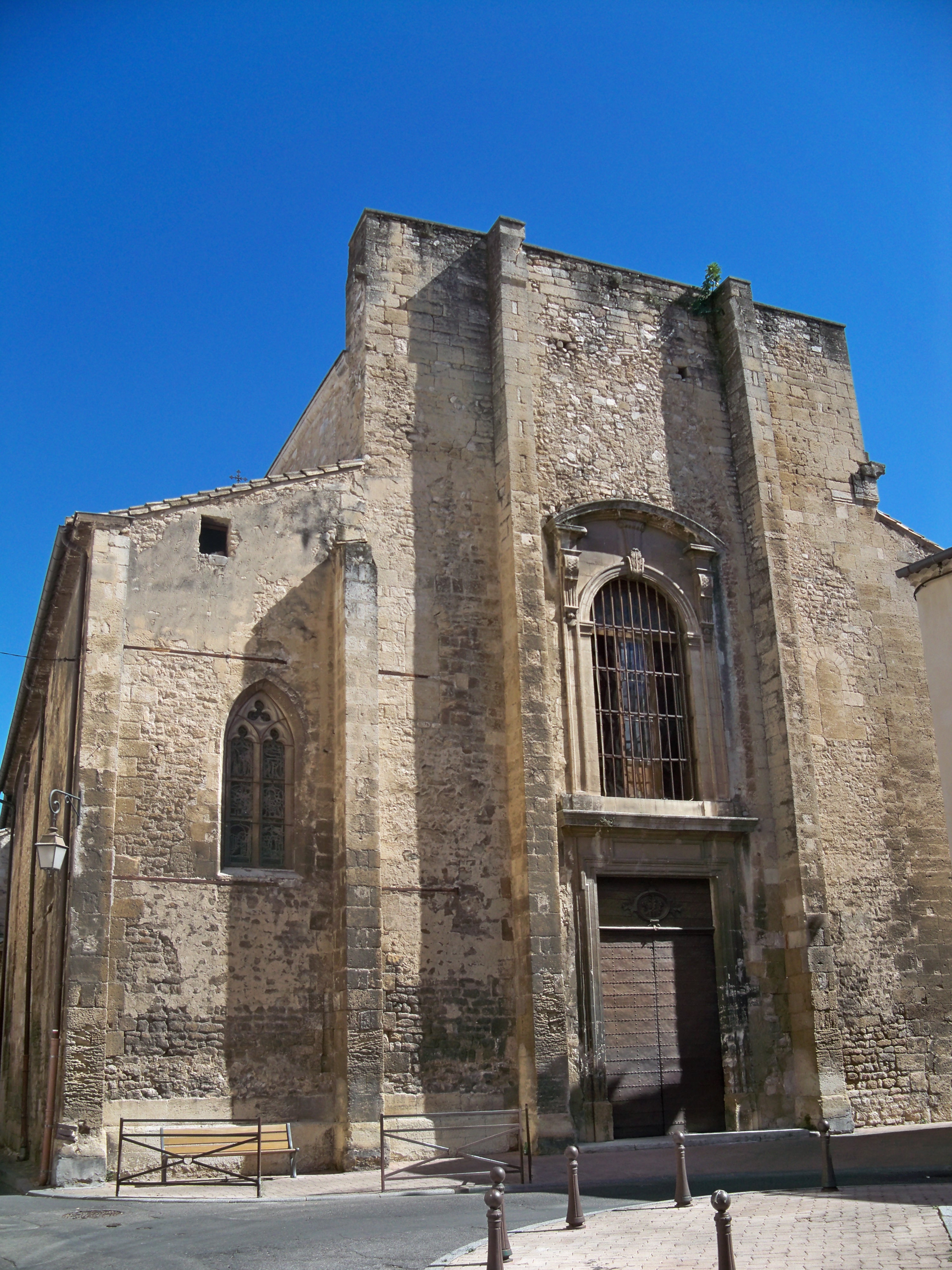
Cavaillon Cathedral

The former French diocese of Cavaillon (Lat. dioecesis Caballicensis) existed until the French Revolution as a diocese of the Comtat Venaissin, a fief of the Church of Rome. It was a member of the ecclesiastical province headed by the Metropolitan Archbishop of Avignon. Its seat was at Cavaillon, in the south-eastern part of what is now France, in the modern department of Vaucluse.

The cathedral was officially dedicated to the Blessed Virgin Mary (Nôtre Dame), but popularly honored Saint Veranus, the sixth-century bishop of Cavaillon. In 1202 the cathedral had a Chapter composed of a Provost, a Precentor, and a Sacristan, to which were added the Archdeacon and 12 Canons.

After the Concordat of 1801, the territory of the diocese passed to the diocese of Avignon.

== Bishops ==
=== To 1400 ===
- Genialis
- 439–451: Julien
- c. 459: Porcien
- 517–529: Philagrius
- c. 549: Praetextatus (Pretextat)
- c. 585: Saint Veran
- c. 788: Lupus (Fr. Loup)
- c. 875: Hildebold
- 906–916: Renard
- c. 951: Heribert
- c. 972: Didier I.
- 976–979: Walcaud
- c. 982: Dietrich
- 991–1014: Enguerrand
- c. 1031: Peter I.
- c. 1055: Clement
- 1070–1075: Raoul
- 1082–1095: Didier II.
- c. 1103: Johannes I.
- c. 1140 – c. 1155: Alfant
- 1156–1178: Benedict
- 1179–1183: Pons I.
- 1184–1202: Bermond
- 1203 – c. 1225: Bertrand de Durfort
- c. 1230 – c. 1250: Gottfried I.
- 1251–1261: Rostaing Belinger
- 1267–1277: Giraud
- 1278 – c. 1280: André I.
- 1282 – c. 1310: Bertrand Imbert
- 1311–1317: Pons II Auger de Laneis
- 1322 – c. 1327: Gottfried II.
- c. 1330: Berenger I.
- c. 1332: Raimond
- 3 August 1334 – 1366: Philippe de Cabassole
- 23 September 1366 – 11 October 1388: François de Cardaillac, O.Min. (transferred to Cahors)
- 15 October 1388 – 1392: Hugo (Hugues) de Magialla
- 16 December 1392 – c. 1405: Andreas (André) (Administrator)

=== From 1400 ===
- c. 1405: Pierre II.
- c. 1408: Guillaume I.
- c. 1409–1421: Nicolas de Johannaccio
- 1421–1424: Guillaume II.
- 1426 – c. 1430: Bernard Carbonet de Riez
- c. 1432: Ferrier Galbert
- c. 1433: Jean II. de La Roche
- c. 1437: Barthélémi
- 1439 – 28 January 1447: Pierre Porcher
- 22 February 1447 – c. 1466–7: Palamède de Carretto
- 9 February 1467 – c. 1484?: Toussaint de Villanova, O.Carm.
- ? c. 1496: Jean Passert
- 15 July 1496 – 22 April 1501: Louis Passert of Padua
- 28 April 1501 – 1507: Bernardino or Beranger Gamberia de Benasque
- 22 November 1507 – 13 August 1524: Cardinal Giovanni Battista Pallavicini
- 9 September 1524 – 24 June 1537: Mario Maffei of Volterra
- 6 July 1537 – 16 July 1540: Cardinal Girolamo Ghinucci (Administrator)
- 1541 – c. 1568: Pietro (Pierre) Ghinucci
- 1569–1584: Cristoforo (Christophe) Scotti (of Piacenza)
- 1584–1585: Domenico (Dominique) Grimaldi (promoted Archbishop of Avignon)
- 1585–1591: Pompeo Rocchi of Lucca (Pompée Rochi de Lucques)
- 27 February 1592 – 1596: Giovanni Francesco Bordini, Orat. (promoted to Avignon)
- 1597–1608: Girolamo Cancelli (Jerome Centelles)
- 1610–1616: Cesare Ottavio Mancini (Octave Mancini)
- 1616–1646: Fabrice de La Bourdaisière
- 23 September 1646 – 1657: Louis de Fortia (transferred to Carpentras)
- 1657 – 23 July 1659: François Hallier
- 1660 – 27 June 1663: Richard de Sade
- 4 September 1665 – 21 December 1707: Jean-Baptiste de Sade de Mazan
- 9 September 1709 – 30 July 1742: Joseph de Guyon de Crochans (promoted Archbishop of Avignon)
- 30 July 1742 – 28 March 1757: François-Marie Manzi (promoted Archbishop of Avignon)
- 28 March 1757 – 5 September 1760: Pierre-Joseph Artaud
- 16 February 1761 – 1790: Louis-Joseph Crispin des Achards de La Baume (fled to Italy)

== Titular See ==
In January 2009 the bishopric was revived by Pope Benedict XVI as a titular see, to provide the ever-increasing number of auxiliary bishops and Vatican bureaucrats with prelatial episcopal status. Theoretically, the titular bishop of Cavaillon belongs to the ecclesiastical province of Marseille. The incumbent between 2009 and 2026 is Krzysztof Zadarko, Auxiliary Bishop of Koszalin-Kołobrzeg (Poland).

== See also ==
- Catholic Church in France
- List of Catholic dioceses in France

== Bibliography ==
=== Reference works ===
- Gams, Pius Bonifatius (1873). Series episcoporum Ecclesiae catholicae: quotquot innotuerunt a beato Petro apostolo. Ratisbon: Typis et Sumptibus Georgii Josephi Manz. pp. 531–532.
- Eubel, Conradus, ed. (1913). Hierarchia catholica, Tomus 1 (second ed.). Münster: Libreria Regensbergiana. (in Latin) p. 178-179.
- Eubel, Conradus, ed. (1914). Hierarchia catholica, Tomus 2 (second ed.). Münster: Libreria Regensbergiana. (in Latin) p. 123.
- Gulik, Guilelmus (1923). Eubel, Conradus (ed.). Hierarchia catholica, Tomus 3 (second ed.). Münster: Libreria Regensbergiana. p. 161.
- Gauchat, Patritius (Patrice) (1935). Hierarchia catholica IV (1592-1667). Münster: Libraria Regensbergiana. p. 143.
- Ritzler, Remigius; Sefrin, Pirminus (1952). Hierarchia catholica medii et recentis aevi V (1667-1730). Patavii: Messagero di S. Antonio. p. 152.
- Ritzler, Remigius; Sefrin, Pirminus (1958). Hierarchia catholica medii et recentis aevi VI (1730-1799). Patavii: Messagero di S. Antonio. p. 157.
- Sainte-Marthe, Denis de (1715). Gallia christiana, in provincias ecclesiasticas distributa (in Latin). Vol. Tomus primus. Paris: Coignard. pp. 939–964.

=== Studies ===
- Duchesne, Louis (1907). Fastes épiscopaux de l'ancienne Gaule: I. Provinces du Sud-Est. Paris: Fontemoing. second edition (in French)
- Halfond, Gregory I. (2010). Archaeology of Frankish Church Councils, AD 511-768. Boston-Leiden: Brill. ISBN 978-90-04-17976-9.
