= Acrotony =

Acrotony (from the Greek words akros (ἄκρος) - extreme, and tonos (τόνος) - tension) is the tendency for plants (common to many trees) to supply sap to branches locate near the crown.

Many trees exhibit acrotony.

This is the opposite of "basitony", which is the tendency of some plants to preferentially supply sap to branches located at the base of the stem.
