= Thierry Mariani =

French politician (born 1958)

Thierry Mariani MEP
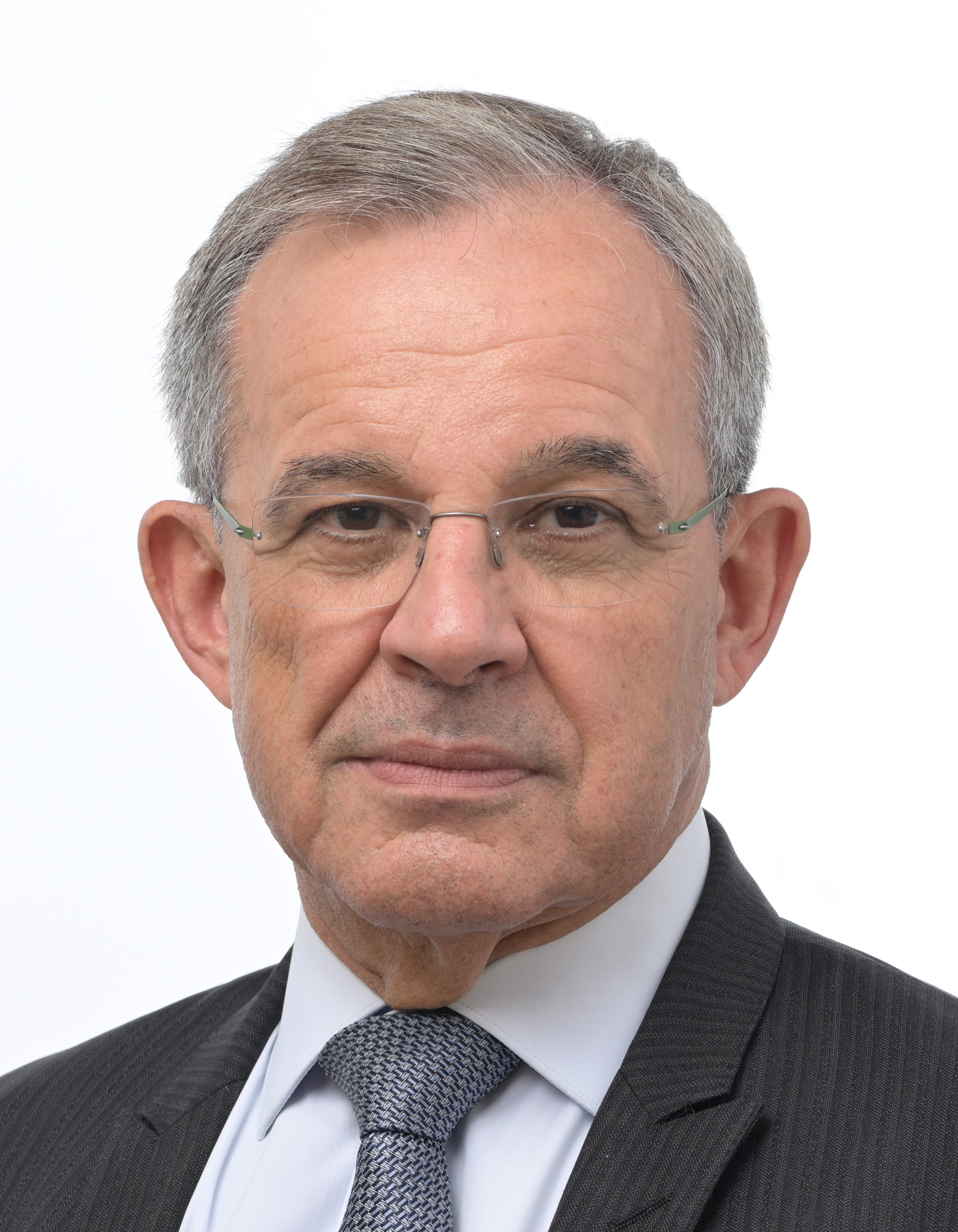

Member of the European Parliament
- Incumbent
- Assumed office 2 June 2019
- Constituency: France

Minister in charge of Transport
- In office 14 November 2010 – 10 May 2012
- Prime Minister: François Fillon
- Preceded by: Dominique Bussereau
- Succeeded by: Frédéric Cuvillier

Member of the National Assembly
- In office 10 May 2012 – 20 June 2017
- Preceded by: Paul Durieu
- Succeeded by: Anne Genetet
- Constituency: 4th of Vaucluse (2012); 11th for French residents overseas (2012–2017)
- In office 2 April 1993 – 14 December 2010
- Preceded by: Jean Gatel
- Succeeded by: Paul Durieu
- Constituency: 4th of Vaucluse

Mayor of Valréas
- In office 1989–2005
- Preceded by: Jean Duffard
- Succeeded by: Nadège Savajols

Personal details
- Born: 8 August 1958 (age 68) Orange, France
- Party: National Rally (since 2019)
- Other political affiliations: Union of Democrats for the Republic (1976); Rally for the Republic (1976–2002); Union for a Popular Movement (2002–2015); The Republicans (2015–2019)

Thierry Mariani (French pronunciation: [tjɛʁi maʁjani]; born 8 August 1958) is a French politician serving as a Member of the European Parliament (MEP) since 2019. He previously served as Minister in charge of Transport under the Minister of Ecology, Sustainable development, Transport and Housing from 2010 to 2012 (with the title of Secretary of State until 2011). A former member of The Republicans (LR), he joined the far-right National Rally in 2019.

Mariani joined the National Rally (RN) list for the 2019 European Parliament election. In the 2021 regional election, he led the party's list in Provence-Alpes-Côte d'Azur. Although he was ahead in the polls for both the first and second round of voting, which would have made him the first president of a Regional Council affiliated with the National Rally, he placed second in the election's second round, losing to incumbent Renaud Muselier, caused by a low turnout rate induced by the COVID-19 pandemic and an election delay.

== Family and education ==
Thierry Mariani was born on 8 August 1958 in Orange. His family is of Italian origin, from Castellafiume. He went to school in Avignon, then Aix-en-Provence, before he attended higher education in Paris.

== Political career ==
=== Early career ===
Mariani started a career in politics in 1976, alongside Nicolas Sarkozy. He held the mayorship of Valréas, the city where he grew up, from 1989 to 2005. He was elected to the General Council of Vaucluse for the canton of Valréas from 1988 to 2001 and served as one of its vice presidents for the last nine years of his tenure. He also was a regional councillor of Provence-Alpes-Côte d'Azur from 1992 to 1993 and again from 2004 to 2015. In the 1993 legislative election, he was elected to the National Assembly in Vaucluse's 4th constituency. He has been a member of the Organization for Security and Co-operation in Europe and an observer of the Organization of the Black Sea Economic Cooperation. In 2009, he was appointed as the French Special Representative for Pakistan and Afghanistan during the Kabul elections.

=== In government ===
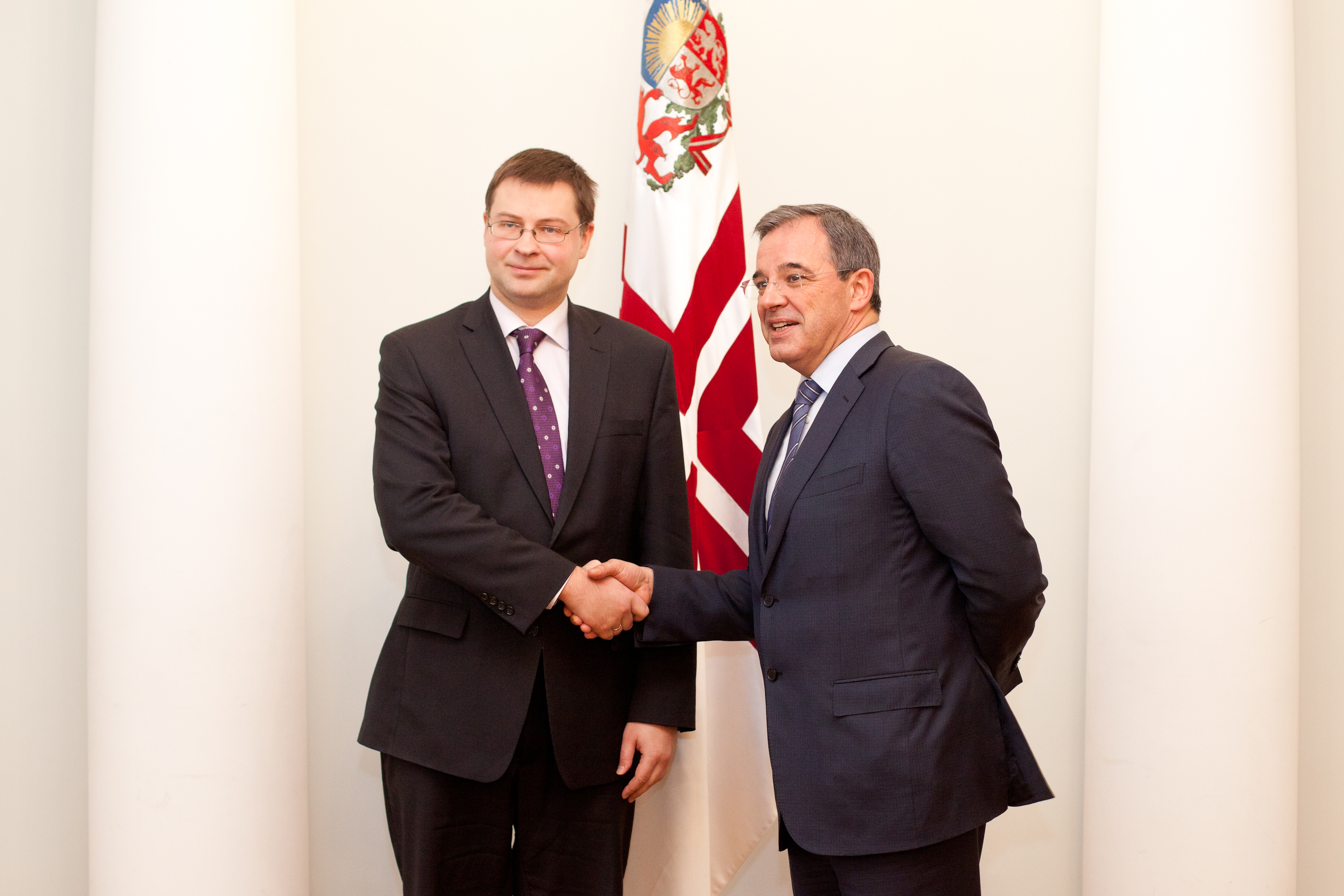
Thierry Mariani with Latvian Prime Minister Valdis Dombrovskis in 2012

On 14 November 2010, he was appointed Secretary of State at the Ministry of Ecology, Sustainable development, Transport and Housing. On 29 June 2011, his title was changed to Minister in charge of Transport, a junior minister office under Minister Nathalie Kosciusko-Morizet.

=== In opposition ===
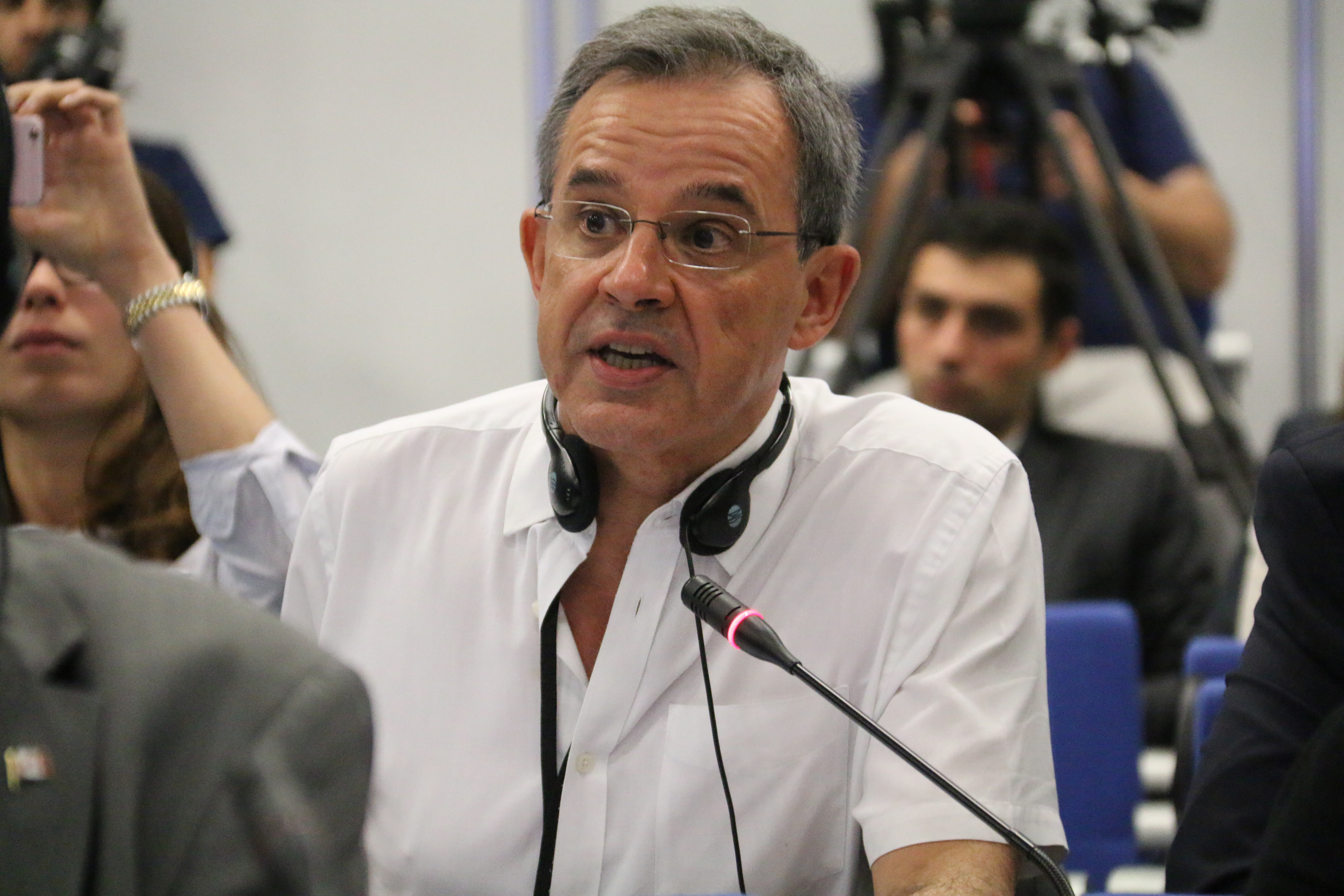
Mariani at the 2016 Annual Session of the OSCE Parliamentary Assembly

In April 2011, the Union for a Popular Movement selected Mariani as its candidate in the newly created eleventh constituency for French residents overseas (covering French citizens resident in most of Asia, the whole of Oceania, as well as part of Eastern Europe) for the 2012 legislative election. In Vaucluse's 4th constituency, he was succeeded by Jacques Bompard. Ahead of the 2017 presidential election, Mariani endorsed former Prime Minister François Fillon's presidential bid. In the subsequent 2017 legislative election, he ran for reelection but was heavily defeated by Anne Genetet. In the 2019 election, he was elected to the European Parliament as an Independent on the National Rally list.

In 2015, Mariani prepared the Council of Europe's report on Chinese migration to Europe, in which he raised "human rights concerns with regard to trafficking and smuggling rings, the lack of legal protection, and the poor work conditions these immigrants often face". From 2012 to 2017, Mariani was a member of the French delegation to the Parliamentary Assembly of the Council of Europe. In this capacity, he served as head of the Committee on Migration, Refugees and Displaced Persons; as member of the Committee on the Honouring of Obligations and Commitments by Member States of the Council of Europe (Monitoring Committee); and as member of the Sub-Committee on Crime Problems and the Fight against Terrorism. In 2017, he served as the National Assembly's rapporteur on Poland.

Mariani was chosen to lead the National Rally list in the 2021 regional election in Provence-Alpes-Côte d'Azur, where he challenged Renaud Muselier's presidency over the regional council. Some commentators deemed the election to be the National Rally's best chance to win a regional majority for the first time in its history. However, his list placed second (42.7%) in the second round after winning the first (36.3%).

== Controversies ==
=== Links with Azerbaijan ===
Therry Mariani is a member of Azerbaijan's Friends Association, which, according to Le Monde, is the main tool of the caviar diplomacy used by the authoritarian state of Azerbaijan especially in France. As a Parliamentary Assembly of the Council of Europe (PACE) member, he was known as one of the key actors of caviar diplomacy in Europe and a strong support of the Ilham Aliyev regime.

The PACE investigation report mentions Mariani as one of the MPs who were not sensitive to human rights violations in Azerbaijan and were backing the Azerbaijani authorities in the PACE. Mariani figures prominently as a friend of the Aliyev regime in the French documentary series by France 2, called Cash Investigation: Mon président est en voyage d’affaires. Mariani has personal relations with the Aliyev family; he has repeatedly spoken alongside Mehriban Aliyeva, Azerbaijan's First Lady, at several Azerbaijani-organised events in France. Mariani is the Chairman of the NGO L'Eurasie, les nouveaux horizons, a member-organisation of the European Academy for Election Observation, an election observation NGO founded by Azerbaijan apologists Stef Goris and Alain Destexhe, which has promoted Azerbaijani interests in Europe. In 2010, the NGO L'Eurasie, les nouveaux horizons co-organised an event with an NGO led by Elkhan Suleymanov, an Azerbaijani MP at the centre of lobbying scandals in the PACE. He was also one of the key persons of the Azerbaijani Laundromat.

=== Russian invasion of Ukraine ===
In July 2015, Mariani, accompanied by Russian officials, made a trip to Crimea which was annexed by Russia in 2014. In interviews and meetings he expressed support: "We welcome the courage of the Crimean Parliament because it was able to make this decision despite the difficult situation and a great risk of escalation". In 2016, he brought non-binding resolutions to the National Assembly and Senate calling on the European Union to lift economic sanctions against Russia. The resolutions, which had symbolic value, were adopted by both chambers in April and June, respectively.

In November 2018, Mariani traveled to Donetsk to act as an observer in the general elections in the Donetsk People's Republic and Luhansk People's Republic.

In September 2021, two preliminary investigations concerning him were started, in connection with his activities within the Franco-Russian Dialogue association. He is suspected of corruption, breach of trust and money laundering as well as influence peddling, since benefits, suspicious financial transactions and travels could have been possible compensation for positions favorable to the Kremlin.

=== Support to the Assad regime ===
Between November 2015 and November 2017, Mariani traveled to Syria five times, for the purpose of meeting with Bashar al-Assad. Justifying his November 2017 travel, he called Bashar al-Assad his "friend". Researcher Marie Peltier presented him as an "agent of Damascus" for his role in the propagation of disinformation, particularly after chemical attacks, and in the dissemination of regime propaganda. In 2020, he called, in a plenary session at the European Parliament, to support the Assad regime to bring peace to the country, and to "exterminate the Syrian rebels".

=== Relation with China ===
Mariani has not supported Taiwan's claim of being the true Republic of China (1912–1949), the East Turkestan independence movement, or the Tibetan independence movement.

== Detail of mandates and functions ==
Governmental functions

Member of the Government of France: Secretary of State for Transport: 2010–2011; Minister in charge of Transport: 2011–2012.

Electoral mandates

European Parliament

Member of the European Parliament for France: 2019–present. Elected in 2019.

National Assembly of France

Member of the National Assembly for Vaucluse (4th constituency): 1993–2010 (resigned to become Secretary of State). Elected in 1993, reelected in 1997, 2002 and 2007.

Member of the National Assembly for French residents overseas (11th constituency): 2012–2017. Elected in 2012.

Regional council

Regional councillor of Provence-Alpes-Côte-d'Azur: 1992–1993 (resignation). 2004–2015. Elected in 1992, reelected in 2004 and 2010.

General council

Vice President of the General Council of Vaucluse: 1992–2001. Elected in 1992, reelected in 1994 and 1998.

General councillor of Vaucluse (canton of Valréas): 1988–2001. Elected in 1988, reelected in 1994 and 1998.

Municipal council

Mayor of Valréas: 1989–2005 (resignation). Elected in 1989, reelected in 1995 and 2001.

Municipal councillor of Valréas: 1989–2005 (resignation). Elected in 1989, reelected in 1995 and 2001.

== Personal life ==
In 2005, Mariani married Irina Chaikhoullina (also known as Irina Ivanko), a Russian national. She obtained French citizenship in 2011.
