= Departmental Council of Vaucluse =

Departmental legislature in France

Departmental Council of Vaucluse Conseil départemental de Vaucluse
- Logo of the Council

History
- Founded: 25 June 1793

Leadership
- President: Dominique Santoni, LR since 1 July 2021

Meeting place
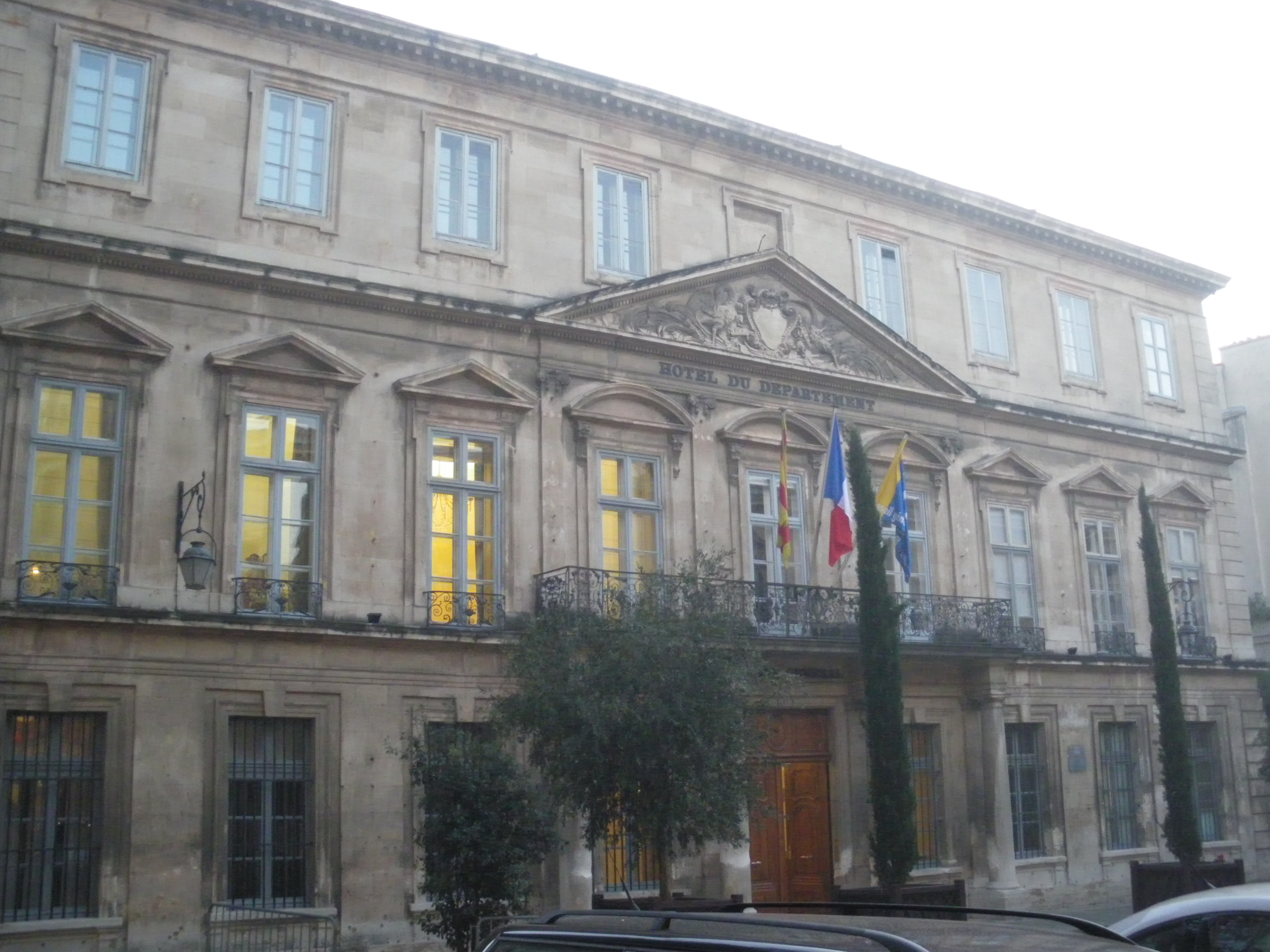
- Headquarters of the Vaucluse departmental council in Avignon

Website
- www.vaucluse.fr

The Departmental Council of Vaucluse (French: Conseil départemental de Vaucluse) is the deliberative assembly of the French department of Vaucluse. The president of the council is Dominique Santoni (LR), since 2021.

== Composition ==
=== Current elected officials ===
The departmental council includes 34 departmental councilors from the 17 cantons of Vaucluse.

Composition (by party)
Party	Acronym	Elected
Majority (12 seats)
The Republicans	LR	10
Radical Party	PR	1
Miscellaneous right	DVD	1
Left opposition (12 seats)
Socialist Party	PS	5
Miscellaneous left	DVG	4
Europe Ecology – The Greens	EELV	2
French Communist Party	PCF	1
Far-right opposition (8 seats)
National Rally	RN	6
League of the South	LS	2
Others (2 seats)

=== Presidents ===
List of successive presidents of the departmental council of Vaucluse since 1912
Period		Name	Party	Reference
1912	1922	Achille Maureau	AD	
1922	1940	Ulysses Fabre	PR	
1945	1948	Gabriel Biron	PS	
1948	1951	Charles Martel	PR	
1951	1970	Jules Niel	PR	
1970	1992	Jean Garcin	PS	
1992	1998	Regis Deroudilhe	RPR	
1998	2001	Jacques Bérard	RPR	
2001	2015	Claude Haut	PS	
2015	2021	Maurice Chabert	LR	
2021	In progress	Dominique Santoni	LR	

=== Vice-presidents ===
Order	Name	Party	Canton (constituency)
1st	Élisabeth Amoros	LR	Cavaillon
2nd	Susanne Bouchet	DVD	Cheval-Blanc
3rd	Pierre Gonzalvez	LR	L'Isle-sur-la-Sorgue
4th	Christelle Jablonski-Castanier	LR	Sorgues
5th	Thierry Lagneau	LR	Sorgues
6th	Patrick Merle	DVD	Apt
7th	Christian Mounier	DVD	Cheval-Blanc
8th	Corinne Testud-Robert	LR	Valréas
9th	Jean-Baptiste Blanc	LR	Cavaillon

== Organization and competencies ==
=== Espaces Départemental des Solidarités ===
The Vaucluse departmental council manages 16 Espaces Départemental des Solidarités (EDeS or transl. Departmental Spaces of Solidarity). These EDeS have four essential tasks: prevention of exclusion; maternal and infantile protection (medical, psychological, social and educational prevention for the health of future parents and children, actions for children at risk and prevention of ill-treatment, prevention actions, screening for disabilities in children aged 0 to 6, approval and training of childminders); assistance for the elderly and disabled; and health prevention and health actions.

=== Decentralized services ===
All the services of the Vaucluse departmental council are relayed to 5 Houses of the Department in the municipalities of Apt, Orange, L'Isle-sur-la-Sorgue, Carpentras and Sault where help and information are offered to facilitate the daily life of the inhabitants.
