= Valréas =

- Commune
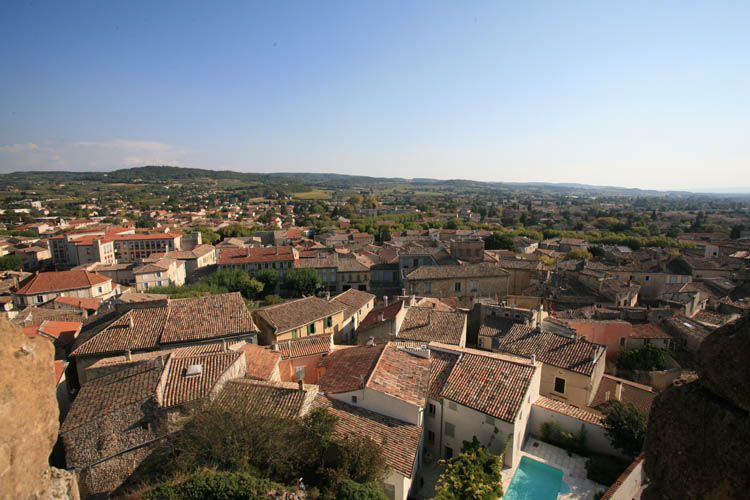
- A view over the roofs, to the south of the village of Valréas

- Coat of arms
- Location of Valréas
- Location within France Location within Provence-Alpes-Côte d'Azur
- Coordinates: 44°23′06″N 4°59′28″E
- Country: France
- Region: Provence-Alpes-Côte d'Azur
- Department: Vaucluse
- Arrondissement: Carpentras
- Canton: Valréas

Government
  - Mayor (2020–2026): Patrick Adrien
- Area^{1}: 57.97 km^{2} (22.38 sq mi)
- Elevation: 276 m (906 ft)
- Highest elevation: 530 m (1,740 ft)
- Lowest elevation: 158 m (518 ft)
- Population (2023): 9,224
  - Density: 159.1/km^{2} (412.1/sq mi)
- Time zone: UTC+01:00 (CET)
  - Summer (DST): UTC+02:00 (CEST)
- INSEE/Postal code: 84138 /84600
- Website: www.valreas.net
- ^{1} French Land Register data, which excludes lakes, ponds, glaciers > 1 km^{2} (0.386 sq mi or 247 acres) and river estuaries.

Valréas (French pronunciation: [valʁeas]; Occitan: Vauriàs) is a commune in the Vaucluse department in the Provence-Alpes-Côte d'Azur region in southeastern France.

== History ==
The area around the town of Valréas is known as L'Enclave des Papes. It is an enclave of Vaucluse, surrounded by the department of the Drôme. The foundation of the Enclave began in 1317 when Pope John XXII bought Valreas for the papacy of Avignon. The story goes that following a visit to Valreas, feeling unwell he was offered some wine from the area. Liking it he decided to purchase the town to ensure his wine supply. Over the next 150 years or so his successors added to the Enclave by the addition of the small towns of Visan, Richerenches and Grillon. The boundaries were defined by tall stone markers carrying the coat of arms of the popes. The present-day boundaries are still delimited by some of these stones, one of which is outside the entrance to the Valreas Tourist office. When the departments of France were created after the Revolution the people of the Enclave requested to remain as part of the department of Vaucluse (see Comtat Venaissin). Hence the "Enclave des Papes".

== Population ==
Historical population
Year	Pop.	±% p.a.
1968	7,886	—
1975	8,458	+1.01%
1982	8,721	+0.44%
1990	9,069	+0.49%
1999	9,425	+0.43%
2007	9,771	+0.45%
2012	9,545	−0.47%
2017	9,422	−0.26%
2023	9,224	−0.35%
Source: INSEE

== Twin towns ==
Valréas is twinned with:

- Sachsenheim, Germany
- Saint Paul, Quebec, Canada
- Montignoso, Italy

== See also ==
- Communes of the Vaucluse department
- List of works by Louis Botinelly
