= Maurice Giro =

French politician (1932–2025)

Deputy of the French National Assembly for Vaucluse's 2nd constituency
- In office 19 June 2002 – 19 June 2007
- Preceded by: André Borel
- Succeeded by: Jean-Claude Bouchet

Mayor of Cavaillon
- In office March 1992 – 16 March 2008
- Preceded by: Maurice Bouchet
- Succeeded by: Jean-Claude Bouchet

Member of the General Council of Vaucluse for the Canton of Cavaillon
- In office 3 October 1988 – 16 July 2002
- Preceded by: Fernand Lombard
- Succeeded by: Jean-Claude Bouchet

Personal details
- Born: 28 April 1932 Salon-de-Provence, France
- Died: 7 October 2025 (aged 93)
- Political party: RPR; UMP

Maurice Giro (French: [moʁis ʒiʁo]; 28 April 1932 – 7 October 2025) was a French politician of the Rally for the Republic (RPR) and the Union for a Popular Movement (UMP).

Giro served in the General Council of Vaucluse from 1988 to 2002, was mayor of Cavaillon from 1992 to 2008, and served as a deputy in the National Assembly from 2002 to 2007. In the National Assembly, he was a member of the Parliamentary Group for Tibet.

Giro died on 7 October 2025, at the age of 93.
