= Cantons of the Vaucluse department =

The following is a list of the 17 cantons of the Vaucluse department, in France, following the French canton reorganisation which came into effect in March 2015:

- Apt
- Avignon-1
- Avignon-2
- Avignon-3
- Bollène
- Carpentras
- Cavaillon
- Cheval-Blanc
- L'Isle-sur-la-Sorgue
- Monteux
- Orange
- Pernes-les-Fontaines
- Pertuis
- Le Pontet
- Sorgues
- Vaison-la-Romaine
- Valréas
