= Caumont-sur-Durance =

Caumont-sur-Durance Caumont de Durença (Occitan)
- Commune
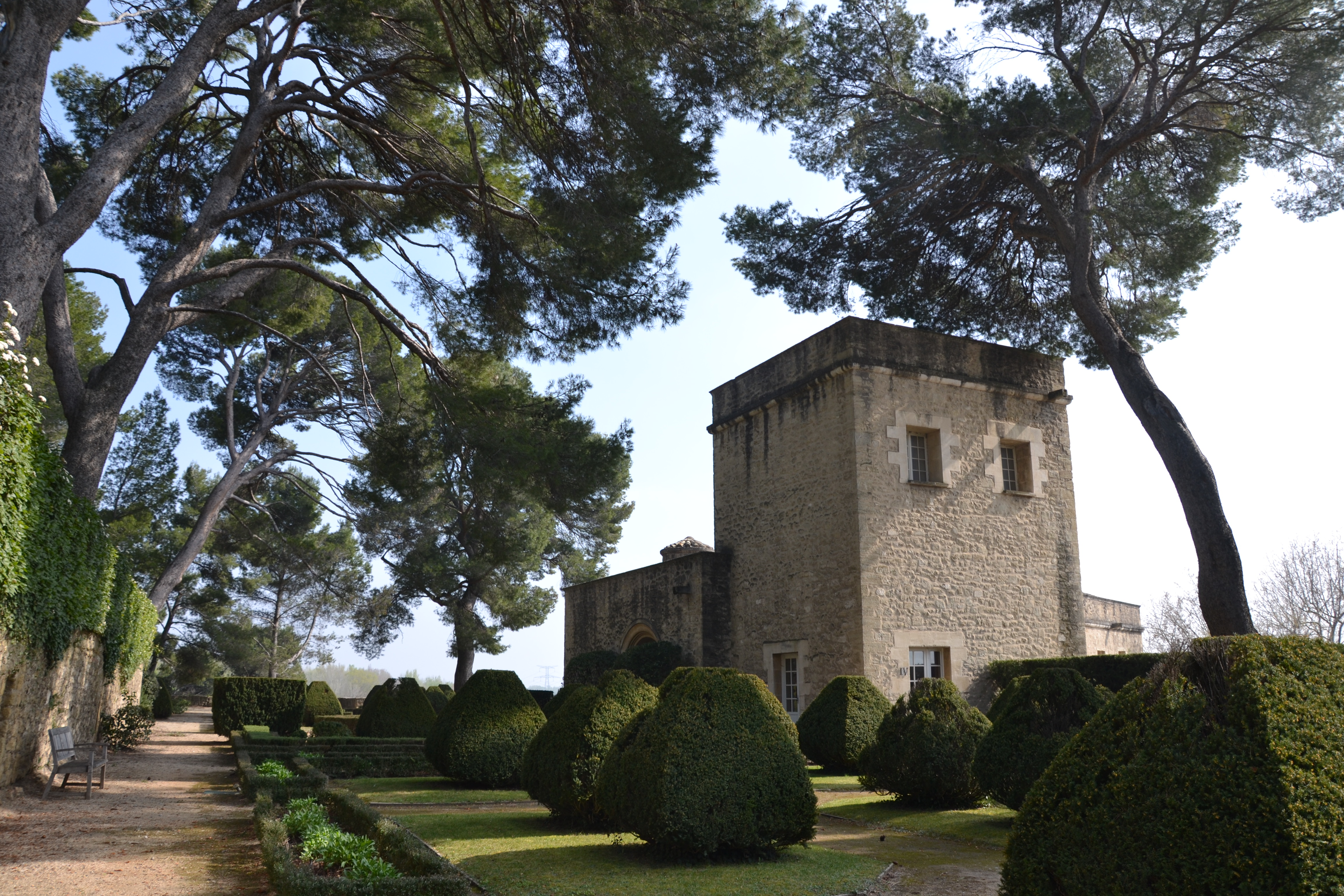
- Charterhouse of Bonpas

- Coat of arms
- Location of Caumont-sur-Durance
- Location within France Location within Provence-Alpes-Côte d'Azur
- Coordinates: 43°53′44″N 4°56′49″E
- Country: France
- Region: Provence-Alpes-Côte d'Azur
- Department: Vaucluse
- Arrondissement: Avignon
- Canton: Cavaillon
- Intercommunality: CA Grand Avignon

Government
  - Mayor (2020–2026): Claude Morel
- Area^{1}: 18.23 km^{2} (7.04 sq mi)
- Elevation: 45 m (148 ft)
- Highest elevation: 134 m (440 ft)
- Lowest elevation: 39 m (128 ft)
- Population (2023): 5,667
  - Density: 310.9/km^{2} (805.1/sq mi)
- Time zone: UTC+01:00 (CET)
  - Summer (DST): UTC+02:00 (CEST)
- INSEE/Postal code: 84034 /84510
- ^{1} French Land Register data, which excludes lakes, ponds, glaciers > 1 km^{2} (0.386 sq mi or 247 acres) and river estuaries.

Caumont-sur-Durance (French pronunciation: [komɔ̃ syʁ dyʁɑ̃s], literally Caumont on Durance; Occitan: Caumont de Durença) is a commune in the Vaucluse department in the Provence-Alpes-Côte d'Azur region of Southeastern France.

== Geography ==
The river Calavon flows into the Durance in the commune. It is home to the Charterhouse of Bonpas (French: Chartreuse de Bonpas), a former Carthusian priory and historic monument.

== Population ==
Historical population
Year	Pop.	±% p.a.
1968	1,637	—
1975	1,951	+2.54%
1982	2,598	+4.18%
1990	3,717	+4.58%
1999	4,253	+1.51%
2007	4,554	+0.86%
2012	4,663	+0.47%
2017	4,885	+0.93%
2023	5,667	+2.51%
Source: INSEE

== See also ==
- Communes of the Vaucluse department
- Avignon – Provence Airport
