= Jean-Claude Bouchet =

French politician (born 1957)

Member of the National Assembly for Vaucluse's 2nd constituency
- In office 20 June 2007 – 21 June 2022
- Preceded by: Maurice Giro
- Succeeded by: Bénédicte Auzanot

Mayor of Cavaillon
- In office 16 March 2008 – 11 July 2017
- Preceded by: Maurice Giro
- Succeeded by: Gérard Daudet

Personal details
- Born: 2 May 1957 (age 68) Cavaillon, France
- Party: The Republicans

Jean-Claude Bouchet (born May 2, 1957 in Cavaillon, Vaucluse) is a French politician of the Republicans (LR) who has been serving as a member of the National Assembly of France since the 2007 elections. He represents the Vaucluse department, and is a member .

== Political career ==
In Parliament, Bouchet serves on the Committee on Foreign Affairs.

== Political positions ==
In the Republicans’ 2016 presidential primaries, Bouchet endorsed Jean-François Copé as the party's candidate for the office of President of France. In the Republicans’ 2017 leadership election, he endorsed Laurent Wauquiez.

In July 2019, Bouchet voted against the French ratification of the European Union’s Comprehensive Economic and Trade Agreement (CETA) with Canada.
