= Jean-Baptiste Blanc =

French politician (born 1972)

Member of the Senate
- Incumbent
- Assumed office 1 October 2020
- Constituency: Vaucluse

Personal details
- Born: 3 September 1972 (age 53)
- Party: LR (since 2015)

Jean-Baptiste Blanc (born 3 September 1972) is a French politician serving as a member of the Senate since 2020. He has been a member of the Departmental Council of Vaucluse since 2008.
