= Arrondissements of the Vaucluse department =

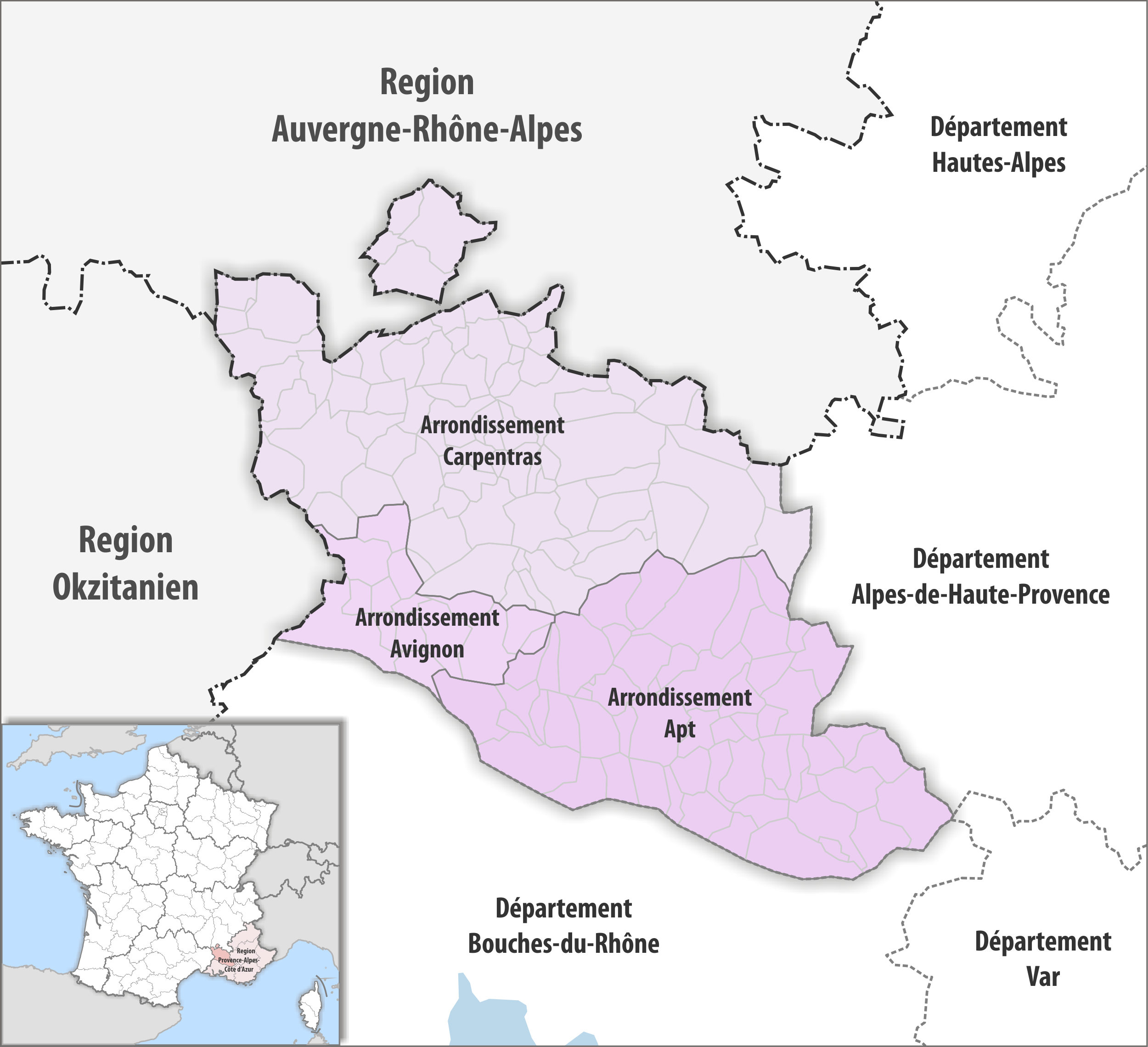
Map of arrondissements of the Vaucluse department.

The 3 arrondissements of the Vaucluse department are:

1. Arrondissement of Apt, (subprefecture: Apt) with 57 communes. The population of the arrondissement was 127,891 in 2021.
2. Arrondissement of Avignon, (prefecture of the Vaucluse department: Avignon) with 16 communes. The population of the arrondissement was 210,535 in 2021.
3. Arrondissement of Carpentras, (subprefecture: Carpentras) with 78 communes. The population of the arrondissement was 226,140 in 2021.

== History ==
In 1800, the arrondissements of Avignon, Apt, Carpentras and Orange were established. The arrondissement of Orange was abolished in 1926. Cavaillon replaced Apt as a subprefecture in 1926, which was reverted in 1933.

The borders of the arrondissements of Vaucluse were modified in January 2017:

- one commune from the arrondissement of Apt to the arrondissement of Avignon
- two communes from the arrondissement of Avignon to the arrondissement of Apt
- 21 communes from the arrondissement of Avignon to the arrondissement of Carpentras
- two communes from the arrondissement of Carpentras to the arrondissement of Avignon
