= Eleventh French legislative constituency for citizens abroad =

Constituency of the French Fifth Republic

11th constituency for French residents overseas
- inline Constituency of the National Assembly of France

- Deputy: Anne Genetet; RE
- Department: none (overseas residents)
- Cantons: none
- Registered voters: 137,852

The Eleventh French legislative constituency for citizens abroad (onzième circonscription des Français établis hors de France) is one of eleven constituencies each electing one representative of French people living outside France to the French National Assembly.

== Area ==
In terms of area, it is the largest of the eleven constituencies, although it also contains fewer registered French citizens than any other constituency bar the Second. It covers all French citizens living in the following fifty countries, namely most of Asia, the whole of Oceania, and four countries of Eastern Europe (including Russia): Afghanistan, Armenia, Australia, Azerbaijan, Bangladesh, Belarus, Brunei, Cambodia, China, Fiji, Georgia, India, Indonesia, Iran, Japan, Kazakhstan, Kiribati, Kyrgyzstan, Laos, Malaysia, the Maldives, the Marshall Islands, the Federated States of Micronesia, Moldova, Mongolia, Myanmar, Nauru, Nepal, New Zealand, Pakistan, Palau, Papua New Guinea, the Philippines, Russia, Samoa, Singapore, the Solomon Islands, South Korea, Sri Lanka, Taiwan, Tajikistan, Thailand, Timor-Leste, Tonga, Turkmenistan, Tuvalu, Ukraine, Uzbekistan, Vanuatu, and Vietnam. The constituency does not include Bhutan or North Korea, two countries with which France has no diplomatic relations, and which are therefore not part of any constituency. Taiwan is included as part of China, as France recognises the One China Policy.

It does not include the French overseas collectivities of French Polynesia, New Caledonia and Wallis and Futuna, which have their own constituencies.

As of New Year's Day 2011, the Eleventh constituency contained 114,826 registered French voters - of which 27,207 in China and 15,821 in Australia, the two countries in the region with the greatest number of registered French residents.

This constituency elected its first ever representative at the 2012 French legislative election.

== Deputies ==
Deputies from the 11th constituency for French residents overseas elected to the National Assembly for the legislatures of the 5th Republic.
Legislature	Start of mandate	End of mandate	Deputy	Party	Notes	Substitute
14th	20 June 2012	20 June 2017	Thierry Mariani	UMP		Catya Martin
15th	21 June 2017	21 June 2022	Anne Genetet	LREM		Charly Strasbach
16th	21 June 2022	9 June 2024	Anne Genetet	LREM		Guillaume Mallet
17th	18 July 2024	Incumbent	Anne Genetet	RE		Remi Provendier

== Election results ==
=== 2024 ===
Candidate	Party	Alliance	First round		Second round	
Candidate	Party	Alliance	Votes	%	Votes	%
Anne Genetet	RE	Ensemble	16,770	39.94	21,468	57.04
Franck Pajot	PS	NFP	12,502	29.78	16,172	42.96
Pierre Brochet	RN		6,424	15.30		
Marrc Guyon	EXD		1,495	3.56		
François Asselineau	DSV		1,376	3.28		
Tania Boteva-Malo	ÉAC		949	2.26		
Anne-France Larquemin	REC		719	1.71		
Jordan Cruciani	ECO		574	1.37		
Françoise Arthur	REG		507	1.21		
Elise Phonrath	DSV		244	0.58		
Jacques Cheminade	DIV		224	0.53		
Nelly Violette	DIV		148	0.35		
Victor Maurel	DIV		30	0.07		
Nathalie Martin	DVG		14	0.03		
Olivier Machet	DIV		10	0.02		
Valid votes			41,986	100.00	37,640	100.00
Blank votes			618	1.45	3,334	8.09
Null votes			91	0.21	233	0.57
Turnout			42,695	40.81	41,207	39.39
Abstentions			61,924	59.19	63,394	60.61
Registered voters			104,619		104,601	
Result			RE HOLD			

=== 2022 ===
Legislative Election 2022: 11th constituency for French citizens overseas
Party	Candidate	Votes	%	±%
LREM (Ensemble)	Anne Genetet	10,539	38.14	-15.97
PCF (NUPÉS)	Dominique Vidal	6,849	24.79	+10.72
REC	Marc Guyon	2,786	10.08	+7.19
DVC	Pascal Gentil	2,626	9.50	N/A
DVE	Christine Vial-Kayser	1,849	6.69	N/A
LR (UDC)	Catya Martin	1,760	6.37	−12.41
RN	Olivier Burlotte	742	2.69	−0.20
LP (UPF)	Tamila Tapayeva	481	1.74	N/A
Turnout		27,632	28.34	+0.72
2nd round result
LREM (Ensemble)	Anne Genetet	16,537	61.73	-8.99
PCF (NUPÉS)	Dominique Vidal	10,253	38.27	N/A
Turnout		26,790	28.94	+6.28
LREM hold				

=== 2017 ===
Candidate	Label	First round		Second round	
Candidate	Label	Votes	%	Votes	%
Anne Genetet	REM	13,732	54.11	14,397	71.72
Thierry Mariani	LR	4,766	18.78	5,676	28.28
Florian Bohême	PS	1,810	7.13		
Dimitri Sawosik	FI	1,651	6.51		
Francis Nizet	DVD	1,495	5.89		
Sébastien Cochard	FN	733	2.89		
Rong Trinh	DIV	336	1.32		
Jennifer Aguiar	DIV	192	0.76		
Nicole Finas-Fillon	DIV	158	0.62		
Robert Gachon	DIV	123	0.48		
Dominique Vidal	PCF	110	0.43		
Roland Gobert	EXD	108	0.43		
Frédéric Nesenshon	DVD	92	0.36		
Myriem Alnet	DIV	74	0.29		
Votes		25,380	100.00	20,073	100.00
Valid votes		25,380	99.04	20,073	95.49
Blank votes		93	0.36	717	3.41
Null votes		152	0.59	230	1.09
Turnout		25,625	27.62	21,020	22.66
Abstentions		67,141	72.38	71,741	77.34
Registered voters		92,766		92,761	
Source: Ministry of the Interior

=== 2012 ===
==== Candidates ====
The list of candidates was officially finalised on 14 May. There were twenty candidates:

The Union for a Popular Movement chose Thierry Mariani, Secretary of State for Transport, as its candidate. Catya Martin was his deputy (suppléante).

The Socialist Party chose Marc Villard, a resident of Ho Chi Minh City and a businessman. His deputy was Laures Desmonts, a resident of Guangzhou.

Europe Écologie–The Greens chose Janick Magne, a long-term resident of Tokyo. Her deputy was William Kohler, a resident of China. Magne taught French at the Kyoritsu Women's University in Tokyo, and presented programmes in French on NHK Educational TV.

Laurent Ballouhey, of the French Communist Party, stood as the candidate of the Left Front, with Max Zins as his deputy.

The National Front chose Aude Bouveron, with Malik Berkane as her deputy.

The centre-right Radical Party and the centrist Republican, Ecologist and Social Alliance jointly chose Paul Dumont, CEO of Francom Asia and a resident of Thailand, as their candidate. His deputy was Roman Masson.

The Radical Party of the Left chose Lisbeth Graille, an artist who had lived and travelled in Georgia and other parts of the Caucasus and Central Asia. Her deputy was Amélie Bizien.

Solidarity and Progress, the French branch of the LaRouche movement, was represented by Cécile Desmas, with Rémi Lebrun as his deputy.

Romain Arcizet, an engineer and resident of Laos, stood as a candidate representing his own newly established Constructive Independent Party (Parti indépendant constructif). His policy was to enable his constituents to choose his vote on any bill in Parliament, which he described as empowering voters beyond the election. His deputy was Nicolas Constant.

Sébastien Breteau was a miscellaneous right candidate, with Séverine Rod as his deputy.

Francis Nizet, who ran a computer services business in Cambodia, was the candidate of the Union for French Democracy. He had also lived and worked in Côte d'Ivoire, Cameroon and China. Catherine Jackson-Grose was his deputy.

Ludovic Chaker, a resident of China, stood as a "social-democratic independent" candidate. Key points in his program were support to bi-national families, support to French entrepreneurs developing or expanding businesses in the Asia-Pacific region, improving healthcare delivery for overseas residents and promoting the contribution made by French people overseas to the interests of the country. His deputy was Michèle Jullian.

Thibault Danjou stood as an "independent centre-right / liberal right" candidate. A resident of Singapore, and former resident of Tokyo, he was a marketing consultant on the exporting of glass. He was a member of the Democratic Movement and of the Liberal Democratic Party, although he was only endorsed by the Liberal Democratic Party. His deputy was Anne-Marie Tezenas du Montcel.

Antoine Bergeot, a notary working "in the Pacific", was an independent candidate, who said he would sit with the right in Parliament if elected. His deputy was Jérôme Chatenay.

Olivier Toison, a businessman, stood as an independent on a platform of economic liberalism. His deputy was Anne-Laure Toison.

The other independent candidates were: Aurélien Lesluye (with Jacques de Soyres as deputy); Alain Peria (with Richard Wright); Idrisse Mohamed (with Favzia Mohamed); Alavandane Ramakichenane (with a deputy identified only as "Bacta"); and Jean-Loup Fayolle (with Corentin Joyeux).

==== Results ====
As in the other expatriate constituencies, turnout in the first round was low. Only in five countries did half or more of registered French citizens vote: Tajikistan (66.7%), Moldova (61.8%), Uzbekistan (57.8%) Burma (55.2%), and Brunei (50%). These were small communities - fewer than 150 registered adults in each. In countries with a sizable expatriate community, turnout tended to be low: 21.1% in Australia, 29.3% in China, 30.5% in India, 33.4% in Japan, 31.4% in Russia, 39.7% in Singapore, 29.1% in Thailand, and 24.3% in Vietnam. Turnout was lowest in Vanuatu (11.4%) and in Iran (15.3%).

This is one of only three expatriate constituencies in which the main candidate of the right finished first in the first round. UMP candidate Thierry Mariani finished first overall, although he was beaten by Socialist candidate Marc Villard in a number of countries - most notably India, Japan, New Zealand, Pakistan (narrowly) and Vietnam. Francis Nizet's third place, with 9.21% of the vote, was the best result for a Democratic Movement-affiliated party in any of the expatriate constituencies.

Legislative Election 2012: Overseas residents 11 - 2nd round
Party	Candidate	Votes	%	±%
UMP	Thierry Mariani	10,390	52.15	−
PS	Marc Villard	9,532	47.85	−
Turnout		20,569	26.07	
UMP win (new seat)				

Legislative Election 2012: Overseas residents 11 - 1st round
Party	Candidate	Votes	%	±%
UMP	Thierry Mariani	7 114	32.59	−
PS	Marc Villard	5 819	26.65	−
UDF	Francis Nizet	2 010	9.21	−
EELV	Janick Magne	1 539	7.05	−
DVD	Sébastien Breteau	1 070	4.90	−
FN	Aude Bouveron	963	4.41	−
Radical	Paul Dumont	645	2.95	−
DVD	Thibault Danjou	520	2.38	−
DVG	Ludovic Chaker	435	1.99	−
FG	Laurent Ballouhey	4.03	1.85	−
PRG	Lisbeth Graille	266	1.22	−
DVD	Antoine Bergeot	238	1.09	−
Independent	Alavandane Ramakichenane	221	1.01	−
Independent	Romain Arcizet	217	0.99	−
Independent	Aurélien Lesluye	135	0.62	−
SP	Cécile Desmas	79	0.36	−
Independent	Jean-Loup Fayolle	78	0.36	−
DVD	Olivier Toison	38	0.17	−
Independent	Alain Peria	31	0.14	−
Independent	Idrisse Mohamed	11	0.05	−
Turnout		22 117	27.9%	n/a
