= Richerenches =

- Commune
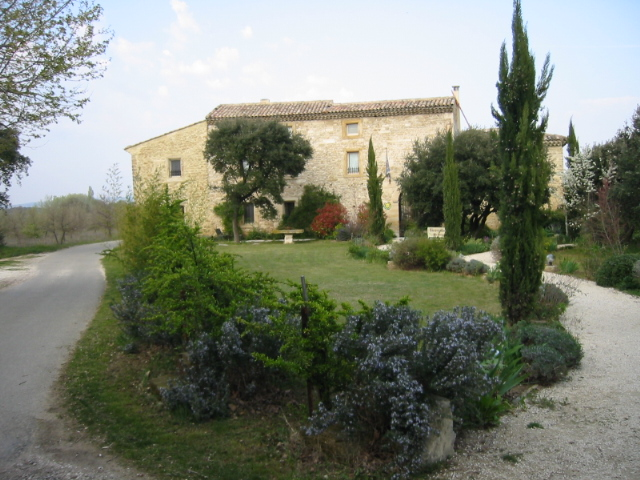
- Farm of the Knights Templar

- Coat of arms
- Location of Richerenches
- Location within France Location within Provence-Alpes-Côte d'Azur
- Coordinates: 44°21′37″N 4°54′47″E
- Country: France
- Region: Provence-Alpes-Côte d'Azur
- Department: Vaucluse
- Arrondissement: Carpentras
- Canton: Valréas

Government
  - Mayor (2020–2026): Pierre-André Valayer
- Area^{1}: 10.96 km^{2} (4.23 sq mi)
- Elevation: 150 m (490 ft)
- Highest elevation: 174 m (571 ft)
- Lowest elevation: 115 m (377 ft)
- Population (2023): 591
  - Density: 53.9/km^{2} (140/sq mi)
- Time zone: UTC+01:00 (CET)
  - Summer (DST): UTC+02:00 (CEST)
- INSEE/Postal code: 84097 /84600
- ^{1} French Land Register data, which excludes lakes, ponds, glaciers > 1 km^{2} (0.386 sq mi or 247 acres) and river estuaries.

Richerenches (French pronunciation: [ʁiʃʁɑ̃ʃ]; Occitan: Richarenchas) is a commune in the Vaucluse department in the Provence-Alpes-Côte d'Azur region in southeastern France.

== Truffles ==
The village is famous for its truffle market as well as for its messe aux truffes in the church located in the village center. Donations are this time not given in money but in 'truffes'. After the service the traditionally dressed brotherhoods of the rabassiers (the people who search for truffles in the ground with trained dogs or pigs) take the donated truffles to a small square in front of the Hôtel de Ville, where they are auctioned. The revenues are for the maintenance of the church and parochial expenses. The village is crowded at this event, that takes place every third Sunday of January.

== Knights Templar ==
In 1136, a local lord, Hugh of Bourbouton, gave the Knights Templar land at Richerenches. Two years later he gave even more, and the next day he took his vows as a Templar. He eventually became the Commander of the Templar commandery of Richerenches, which rose to be one of the most important Templar commanderies in Provence.

== In popular culture ==
The village is mentioned in Season 4 Episode 1 of the TV series Warehouse 13 as being the location for a fictitious cult derived from the Knights Templar called the Brotherhood of the Black Diamond.

== See also ==
- Communes of the Vaucluse department
