= Grillon =

- Commune
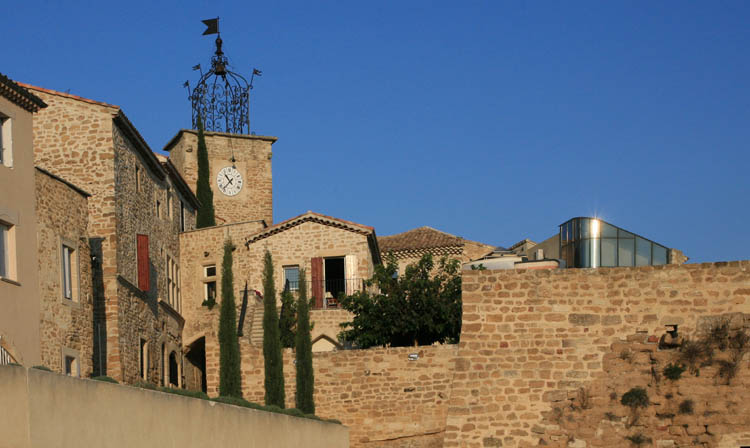
- The clock tower in the village of Grillon

- Coat of arms
- Location of Grillon
- Location within France Location within Provence-Alpes-Côte d'Azur
- Coordinates: 44°23′44″N 4°55′50″E
- Country: France
- Region: Provence-Alpes-Côte d'Azur
- Department: Vaucluse
- Arrondissement: Carpentras
- Canton: Valréas

Government
  - Mayor (2020–2026): Jean-Marie Grosset
- Area^{1}: 14.92 km^{2} (5.76 sq mi)
- Elevation: 176 m (577 ft)
- Highest elevation: 248 m (814 ft)
- Lowest elevation: 154 m (505 ft)
- Population (2023): 1,690
  - Density: 113/km^{2} (293/sq mi)
- Time zone: UTC+01:00 (CET)
  - Summer (DST): UTC+02:00 (CEST)
- INSEE/Postal code: 84053 /84600
- ^{1} French Land Register data, which excludes lakes, ponds, glaciers > 1 km^{2} (0.386 sq mi or 247 acres) and river estuaries.

Grillon (French pronunciation: [ɡʁijɔ̃]; Occitan: Grilhon) is a commune in the Vaucluse department in the Provence-Alpes-Côte d'Azur region in southeastern France.

It lies approximately 6 kilometres (4 miles) from the Château and village of Grignan.

== International relations ==
Grillon is twinned with Ano Syros, Greece.

== See also ==
- Communes of the Vaucluse department
