= Visan =

- Commune
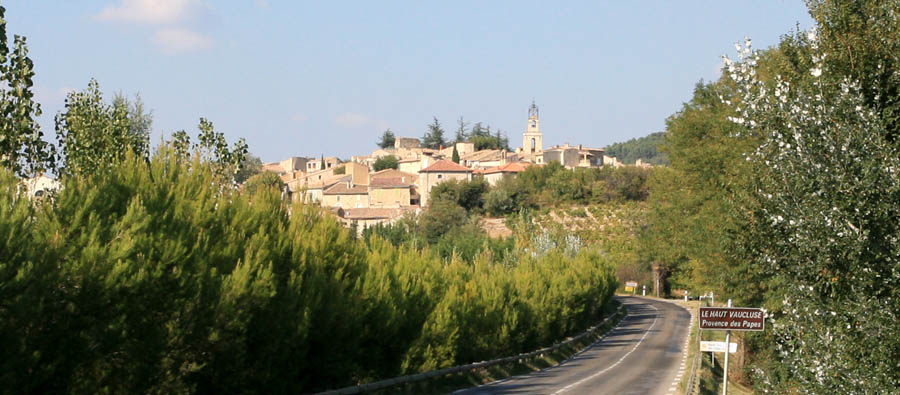
- A view along the road entering Visan

- Coat of arms
- Location of Visan
- Location within France Location within Provence-Alpes-Côte d'Azur
- Coordinates: 44°18′56″N 4°57′05″E
- Country: France
- Region: Provence-Alpes-Côte d'Azur
- Department: Vaucluse
- Arrondissement: Carpentras
- Canton: Valréas
- Intercommunality: Enclave des Papes-Pays de Grignan

Government
  - Mayor (2023–2026): Eric Phetisson
- Area^{1}: 41.07 km^{2} (15.86 sq mi)
- Elevation: 226 m (741 ft)
- Highest elevation: 386 m (1,266 ft)
- Lowest elevation: 112 m (367 ft)
- Population (2023): 1,857
  - Density: 45.22/km^{2} (117.1/sq mi)
- Time zone: UTC+01:00 (CET)
  - Summer (DST): UTC+02:00 (CEST)
- INSEE/Postal code: 84150 /84820
- ^{1} French Land Register data, which excludes lakes, ponds, glaciers > 1 km^{2} (0.386 sq mi or 247 acres) and river estuaries.

Visan (French pronunciation: [vizɑ̃]) is a commune in the Vaucluse department in the Provence-Alpes-Côte d'Azur region in southeastern France.

== See also ==
- La Ferme Célébrités
- Communes of the Vaucluse department
