= Vaucluse's 2nd constituency =

Constituency of the National Assembly of France

2nd constituency of Vaucluse
- inline Constituency of the National Assembly of France

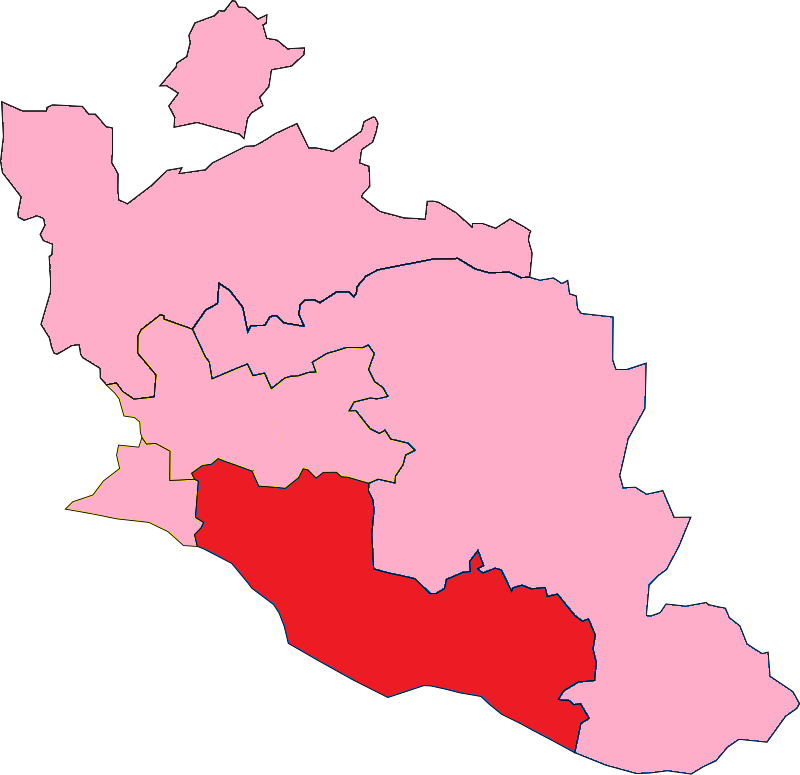
- Vaucluse's 2nd Constituency shown within the Vaucluse
- Deputy: Bénédicte Auzanot; RN
- Department: Vaucluse
- Cantons: Bonnieux, Cadenet, Cavaillon, L'Isle-sur-la-Sorgue
- Registered voters: 83,311

The 2nd constituency of the Vaucluse (French: Deuxième circonscription de Vaucluse) is a French legislative constituency in the Vaucluse département. Like the other 576 French constituencies, it elects one MP using the two-round system, with a run-off if no candidate receives over 50% of the vote in the first round.

== Description ==
The 2nd constituency of the Vaucluse lies in the south of the department.

In recent years the seat has favoured centre right candidates.

== Assembly Members ==
Election	Member	Party
1988	André Borel	PS
1993	Yves Rousset-Rouard	UDF
1997	André Borel	PS
2002	Maurice Giro	UMP
2007	Jean-Claude Bouchet	UMP
2012	Jean-Claude Bouchet	UMP
2017	Jean-Claude Bouchet	LR
2022	Bénédicte Auzanot	RN

== Election results ==
=== 2024 ===
Legislative Election 2024: Vaucluse's 2nd constituency
Party	Candidate	Votes	%	±%
LO	Gérard Mangiavillano	590	1.02	n/a
REC	Julien Langard	999	1.72	−8.82
DIV	José-Angel Sanchez	84	0.14	n/a
MoDem (Ensemble)	Sylvie Viala	11,260	19.40	−3.67
LR	Dominique Brogi	4,008	6.91	−3.11
RN	Bénédicte Auzanot	26,667	45.95	+19.87
PS (NFP)	Patrick Blanes	14,421	24.85	n/a
Turnout		58,029	97.38	+48.82
Registered electors		86,479		
2nd round result
RN	Bénédicte Auzanot	31,195	56.98	+4.79
PS	Patrick Blanes	23,551	43.02	n/a
Turnout		54,746	92.09	+45.37
Registered electors		86,496		
RN hold				

=== 2022 ===
Legislative Election 2022: Vaucluse's 2nd constituency
Party	Candidate	Votes	%	±%
RN	Bénédicte Auzanot	10,662	26.08	+3.59
MoDem (Ensemble)	Sylvie Viala	9,432	23.07	-6.44
LFI (NUPÉS)	François Sandoz	8,804	21.53	+1.21
REC	Stanislas Rigault	4,308	10.54	N/A
LR (UDC)	Elisabeth Amoros	4,096	10.02	−12.58
DVE	Joséfa Leon	1,058	2.59	N/A
Others	N/A	2,527	8.76	
Turnout		40,888	48.56	−0.56
2nd round result
RN	Bénédicte Auzanot	19,223	52.19	N/A
MoDem (Ensemble)	Sylvie Viala	17,608	47.81	+0.57
Turnout		36,831	46.72	+11.03
RN gain from LR				

=== 2017 ===
Legislative Election 2017: Vaucluse's 2nd constituency
Party	Candidate	Votes	%	±%
LREM	Sonia Strapelias	12,077	29.51	
LR	Jean-Claude Bouchet	9,249	22.60	
FN	Thibaut de La Tocnaye	9,205	22.49	
LFI	Laurent Therond	5,120	12.51	
PS	Philippe Batoux	1,981	4.84	
EELV	Annie Rosenblatt	1,216	2.97	
DVE	Claude Sala	840	2.05	
Others	N/A	1,239		
Turnout		40,927	49.12	
2nd round result
LR	Jean-Claude Bouchet	16,763	53.39	
LREM	Sonia Strapelias	14,634	46.61	
Turnout		31,397	37.69	
LR hold				

=== 2012 ===
Legislative Election 2012: Vaucluse's 2nd constituency
Party	Candidate	Votes	%	±%
UMP	Jean-Claude Bouchet	13,853	28.24	
FN	Emile Cavasino	13,422	27.36	
EELV	Jacques Olivier	9,608	19.59	
DVG	Michel Fuillet	7,444	15.17	
FG	Marc Brunet	2,527	5.15	
NM	Christophe Lombard	1,623	3.31	
Others	N/A	579		
Turnout		49,056	61.02	
2nd round result
UMP	Jean-Claude Bouchet	21,293	55.54	
FN	Emile Cavasino	17,045	44.46	
Turnout		38,338	47.68	
UMP hold				

=== 2007 ===
Legislative Election 2007: Vaucluse's 2nd constituency
Party	Candidate	Votes	%	±%
UMP	Jean-Claude Bouchet	25,169	34.16	
PS	Jean-Louis Joseph	18,437	25.02	
DVD	Maurice Giro	10,511	14.26	
MoDem	Nicole Bouisse	5,069	6.88	
FN	Marie-Odile Raye	4,830	6.55	
LV	Genevieve Thiebaut	2,180	2.96	
PCF	Lydie Antonelli	2,060	2.80	
Far left	Dominique Durin-Gaubert	1,934	2.62	
Others	N/A	2,230		
Turnout		74,930	62.07	
2nd round result
UMP	Jean-Claude Bouchet	39,523	55.28	
PS	Jean-Louis Joseph	31,970	44.72	
Turnout		74,020	61.32	
UMP hold				

=== 2002 ===
Legislative Election 2002: Vaucluse's 2nd constituency
Party	Candidate	Votes	%	±%
PS	Jean-Louis Joseph	19,576	27.59	
UMP	Maurice Giro	14,805	20.87	
FN	Nadine Ephrem-Bellier	13,676	19.28	
UDF	Germain Giraud	7,104	10.01	
DVD	Maurice Chabert	4,950	6.98	
PCF	Louis Gerent	2,065	2.91	
CPNT	Daniel Audibert	1,689	2.38	
Others	N/A	7,083		
Turnout		72,593	65.81	
2nd round result
UMP	Maurice Giro	33,178	52.24	
PS	Jean-Louis Joseph	30,329	47.76	
Turnout		67,300	61.01	
UMP gain from PS				

=== 1997 ===
Legislative Election 1997: Vaucluse's 2nd constituency
Party	Candidate	Votes	%	±%
UDF	Yves Rousset-Rouard	18,473	27.85	
PS	André Borel	17,966	27.09	
FN	Simone Rémond	14,851	22.39	
PCF	Louis Gerent	6,579	9.92	
LV	Anne-Marie Billiottet	3,441	5.19	
DVD	Nicole Arnaud-Martinez	2,001	3.02	
Others	N/A	3,010		
Turnout		69,682	69.38	
2nd round result
PS	André Borel	31,596	43.19	
UDF	Yves Rousset-Rouard	29,044	39.70	
FN	Simone Rémond	12,518	17.11	
Turnout		75,877	75.55	
PS gain from UDF				
