= Anne Genetet =

French politician (born 1963)

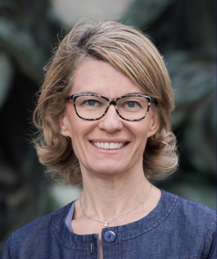
- Genetet in 2017

Minister of National Education
- In office 21 September 2024 – 23 December 2024
- Prime Minister: Michel Barnier
- Preceded by: Nicole Belloubet
- Succeeded by: Élisabeth Borne

Member of the National Assembly for the 11th constituency for French residents overseas
- In office 21 June 2017 – 21 October 2024
- Preceded by: Thierry Mariani
- Succeeded by: Rémi Provendier

Member of the Escamps City Council
- Incumbent
- Assumed office 28 June 2020

Personal details
- Born: 20 April 1963 (age 63) Neuilly-sur-Seine, France
- Party: Renaissance
- Children: 4
- Education: Paris Descartes University
- Occupation: Physician • Journalist • Politician

Anne Genetet (born 20 April 1963) is a French medical doctor and politician of Renaissance (RE) who briefly served as the Minister of National Education in the Barnier government from September to December 2024. She represented the 11th constituency for French residents overseas in the National Assembly from 2017 to 2024.

== Early career ==
In 2005, Genetet moved to Singapore with her husband and four sons. She subsequently founded the Help Agency, a consultancy to advise maids and their employers on health and legal matters. She also worked with non-governmental organizations on maid issues.

== Political career ==
In parliament, Genetet serves on the Committee on Foreign Affairs and the Parliamentary Office for the Evaluation of Scientific and Technological Choices (OPECST).

In addition to her committee assignments, Genetet chairs the French-Iranian Parliamentary Friendship Group. Since 2022, she has been part of the French delegation to the NATO Parliamentary Assembly, where she serves on the Economics and Security Committee, the Sub-Committee on Transition and Development, the Sub-Committee on Transatlantic Economic Relations and the Ukraine-NATO Interparliamentary Council. She is also part of the Inter-Parliamentary Alliance on China.

== Political positions ==
In May 2018, Genetet co-sponsored an initiative in favour of legalizing assisted reproductive technology (ART) for all women (singles, heterosexual couples or lesbian couples).

In July 2019, Genetet voted in favor of the French ratification of the European Union’s Comprehensive Economic and Trade Agreement (CETA) with Canada.
