= Bénédicte Auzanot =

French politician (born 1972)

- Auzanot in 2026

Member of the National Assembly for Vaucluse's 2nd constituency
- Incumbent
- Assumed office 22 June 2022
- Preceded by: Jean-Claude Bouchet

Member of the Regional Council of Provence-Alpes-Côte d'Azur
- Incumbent
- Assumed office 2 July 2021

Personal details
- Born: 5 August 1972 (age 54) Besançon, France
- Party: National Rally
- Occupation: Politician

Bénédicte Auzanot (French pronunciation: [benedikt ozano]; born 5 August 1972) is a French politician of the National Rally (RN) who has represented the 2nd constituency of Vaucluse in the National Assembly since 2022. She has also been a member of the Regional Council of Provence-Alpes-Côte d'Azur since 2021.

== Career ==
Auzanot was born in Besançon in 1972. She worked at a law firm as a legal secretary before entering politics.

She led the National Rally list in Cavaillon in 2020 and 2026, which earned 34.8% and 45.2% of the second-round vote respectively. She led the RN list in the 2020 Senate election in Vaucluse, earning 12.5% of the vote. In 2021 she was elected to the Regional Council of Provence-Alpes-Côte d'Azur.

In the 2022 legislative election Auzanot contested Vaucluse's 2nd constituency after incumbent deputy Jean-Claude Bouchet of The Republicans declined to run for a fourth term. She won the seat with 52.1% of the second-round vote. She resigned her seat on the municipal council of Cavaillon following her election as a deputy. In the 2024 snap legislative election she won reelection with 56.9% of the second-round vote.

Since her election to Parliament she has served on the Committee on Social Affairs (2022–2023) and Committee on Cultural Affairs and Education (2023–present).

== Political positions ==
In 2022, she declined to vote to make abortion a constitutional right.
