= Canton of Cavaillon =

Coordinates: 43°54′30″N 5°02′52″E

Cavaillon
- Canton
- Country: France
- Region: Provence-Alpes-Côte d'Azur
- Department: Vaucluse
- No. of communes: {{{nbcomm}}}
- Area: 64.19 km^{2} (24.78 sq mi)
- Population (2023): 31,303
  - Density: 487.7/km^{2} (1,263/sq mi)
- INSEE code: 84 07

The canton of Cavaillon is a French administrative division in the department of Vaucluse and region Provence-Alpes-Côte d'Azur.

== Composition ==
At the French canton reorganisation which came into effect in March 2015, the canton was reduced from 6 to 2 communes:

- Caumont-sur-Durance : 4,663 inhabitants (2012)
- Cavaillon : 25,289 inhabitants (2012)
