= Canton of Valréas =

Coordinates: 44°21′51″N 4°56′48″E

Valréas
- Canton
- Country: France
- Region: Provence-Alpes-Côte d'Azur
- Department: Vaucluse
- No. of communes: {{{nbcomm}}}
- Area: 124.92 km^{2} (48.23 sq mi)
- Population (2023): 13,362
  - Density: 106.96/km^{2} (277.04/sq mi)
- INSEE code: 8417

The canton of Valréas, sometimes called the enclave des Papes ("Enclave of the Popes"), is a canton of the Vaucluse department, a part of the Provence-Alpes-Côte d'Azur (PACA) region in Southern France. It consists of four communes: Grillon, Richerenches, Valréas and Visan.

== Location ==
The Enclave des Papes is surrounded by the Drôme département, separated from the Vaucluse proper by roughly 2.5 km at the closest point. Its four towns, Valréas, Visan, Grillon and Richerenches have a rich history. For the Vaucluse, the Enclave des Papes is an exclave; for the Drôme, it is an enclave.

== History ==
From 1305 to 1378, the Popes lived in Avignon, in what is now France, and were under the influence of the French kings. During this period, known as the Avignon Papacy, the city of Avignon and the adjacent Comtat Venaissin were added to the Papal States.

In 1316 the Cardinals chose a sickly man, hoping that his reign as Pope would be short. Pope John XXII surprised them; he died at the age of 89 after 18 years of pontifical reign. All of this, so the story goes, thanks to the excellent wines of the Valréas region. When he had travelled through Valréas, he liked the wine so much that, in 1317, he purchased the estate of Valréas. Pope Clement VI later added the villages of Visan, Grillon and Richerenches. The Enclave des Papes was born.

Papal control persisted until the French Revolution; in 1791, an unauthorized plebiscite was held, and the inhabitants voted for annexation by France. The papacy did not, however, recognise this formally until 1814. The Enclave des Papes was incorporated first into the département of Drôme but was later joined to the département of Vaucluse.
