= Vaucluse =

Department in Provence-Alpes-Côte d'Azur, France

Vaucluse Vauclusa (Occitan)
- Department
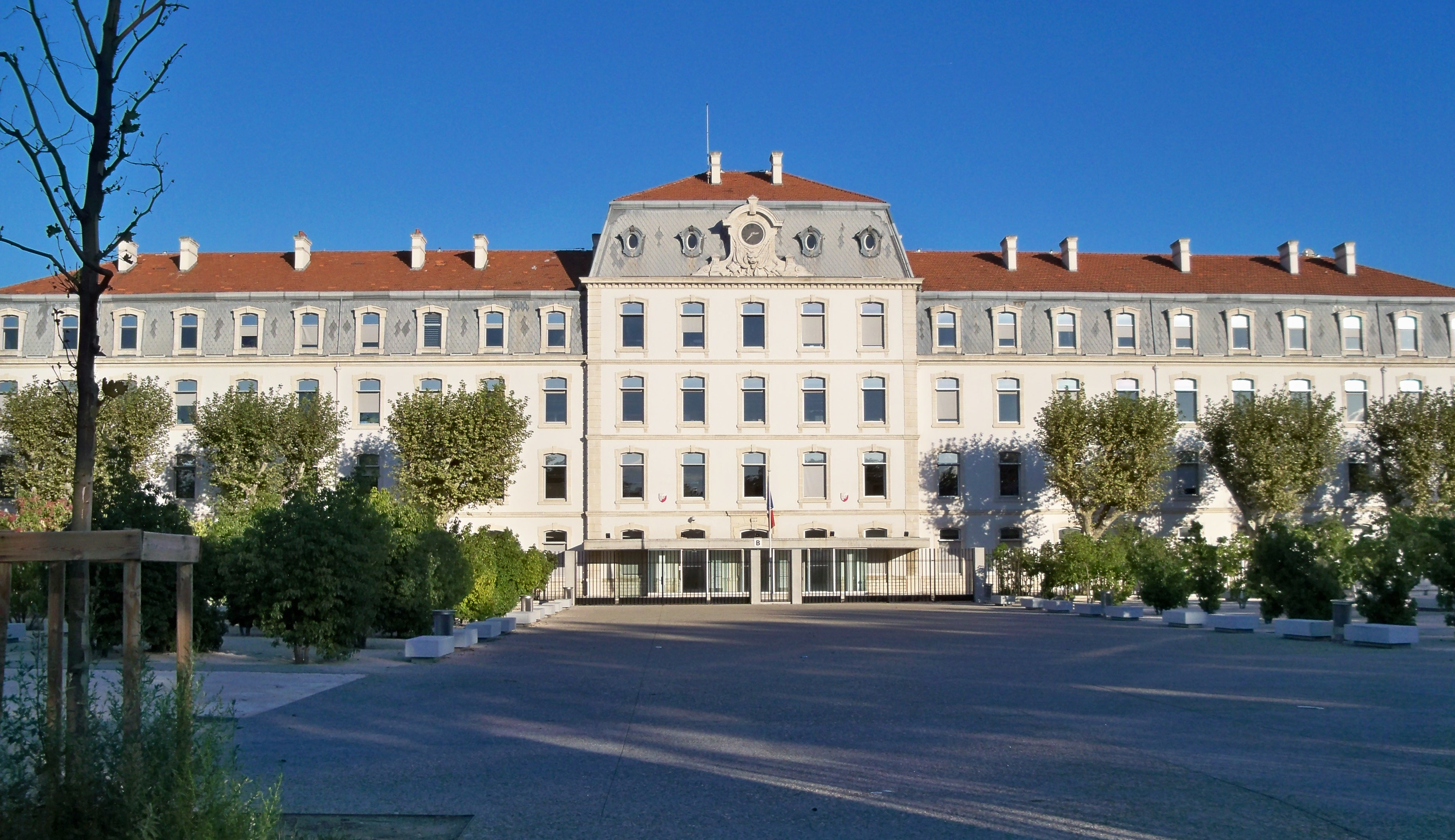
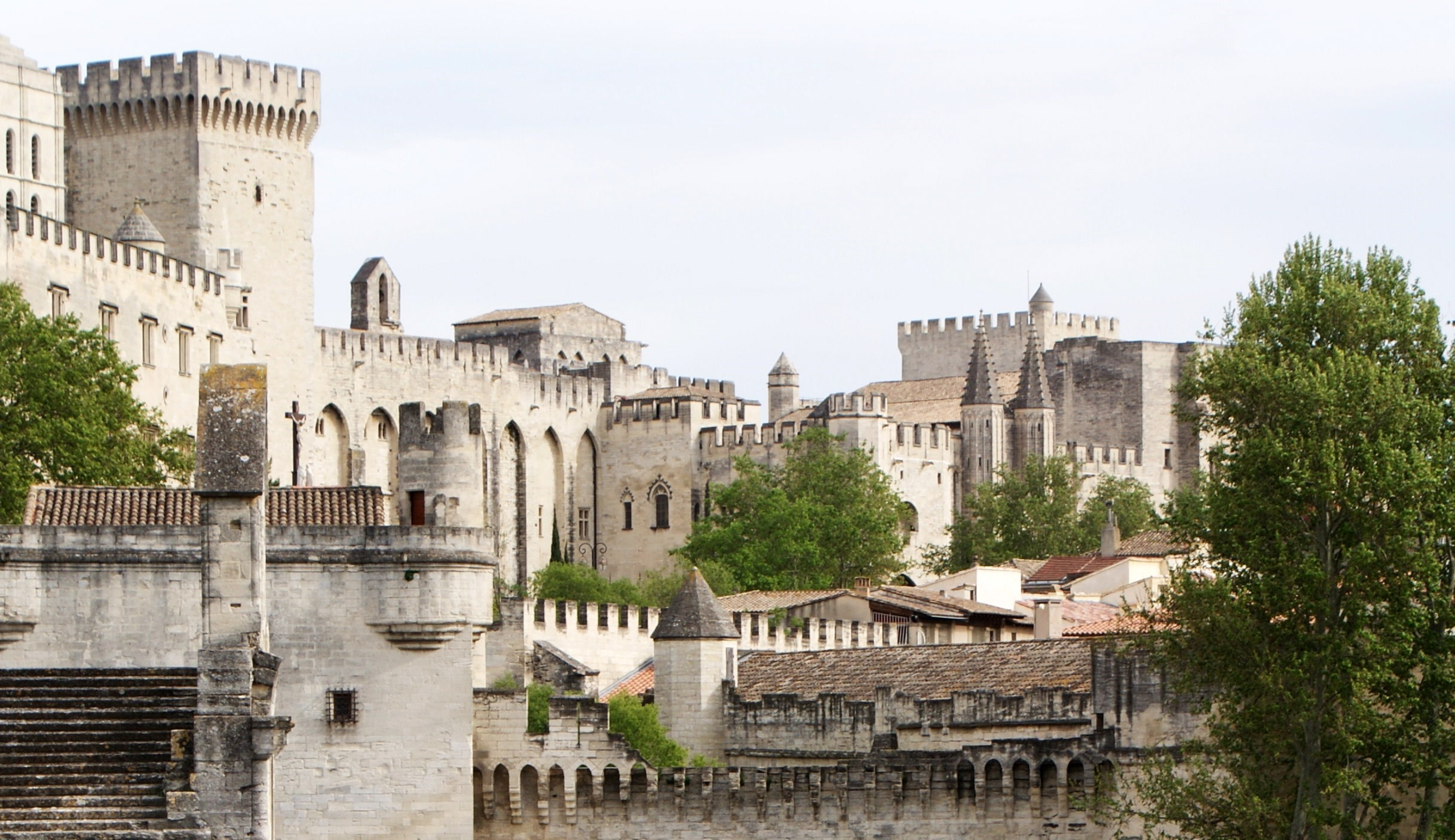
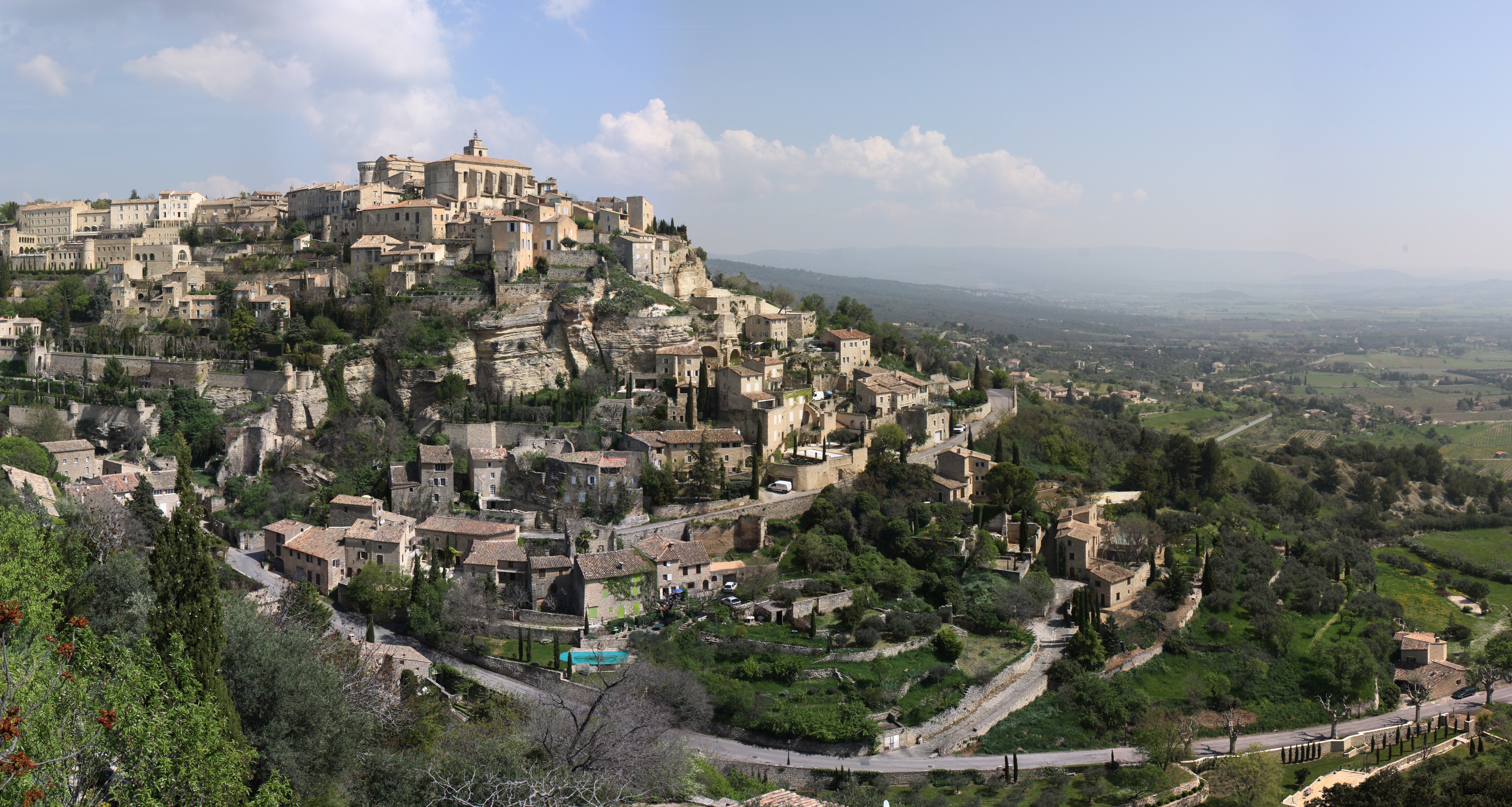
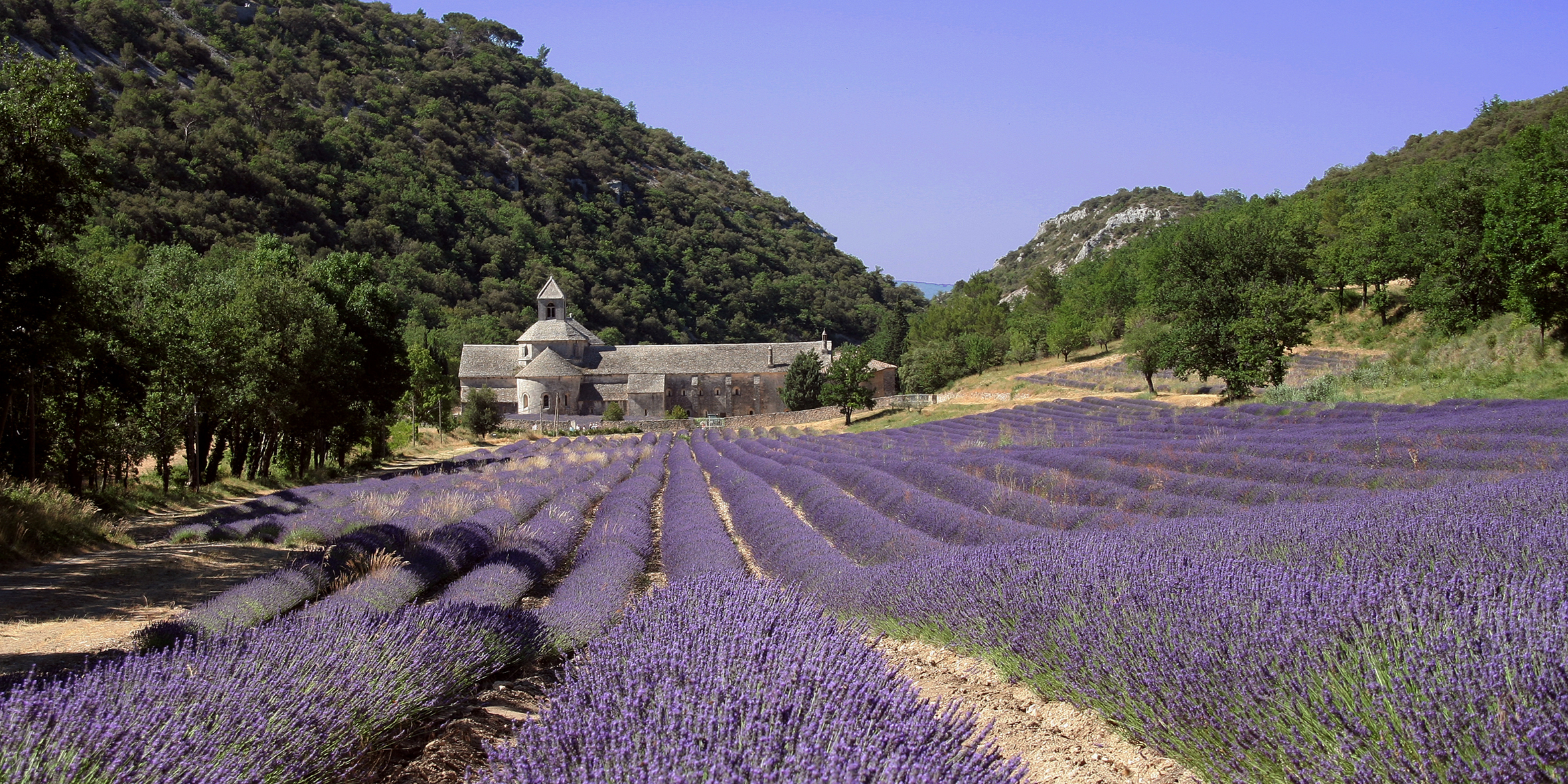
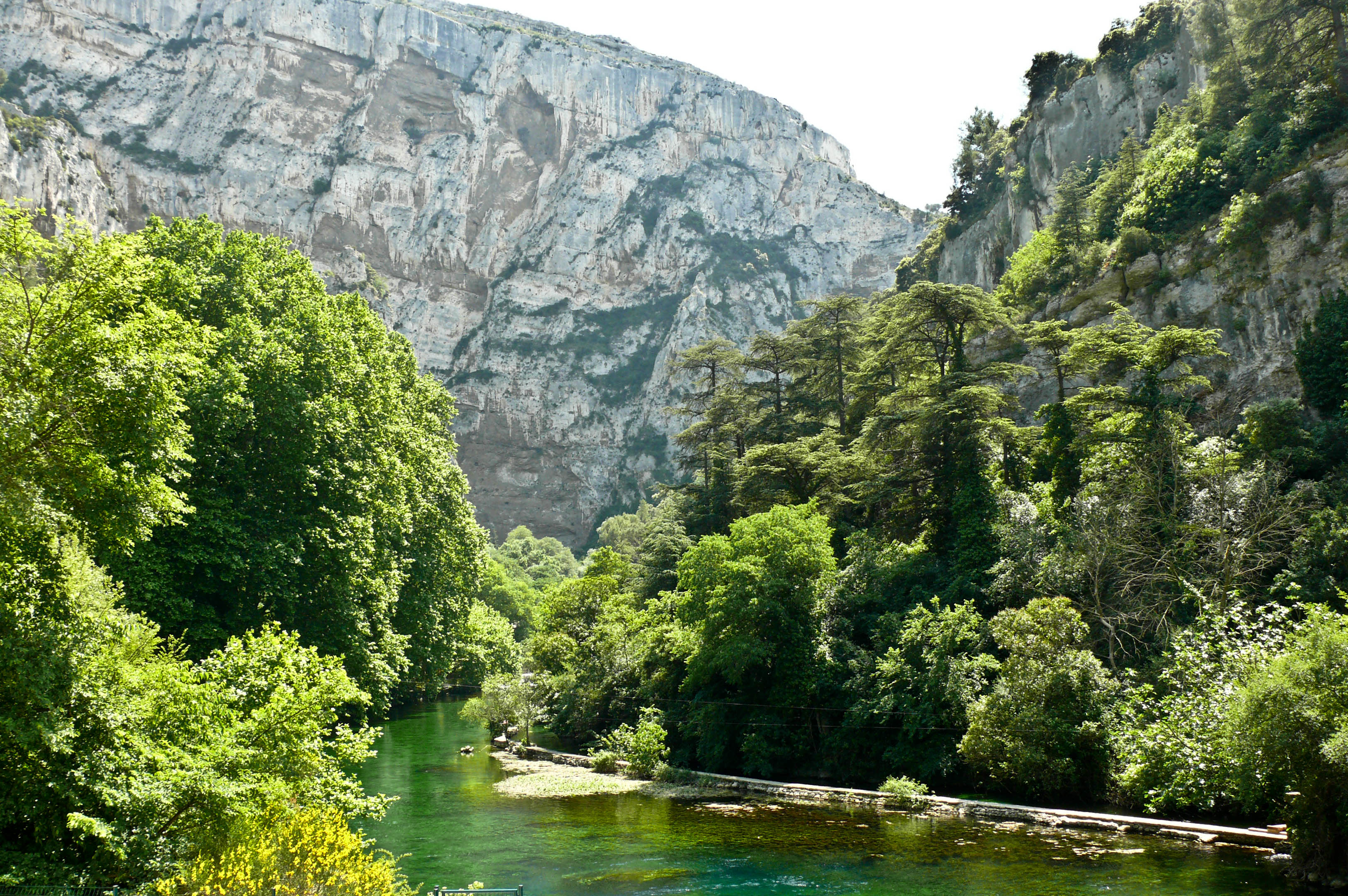
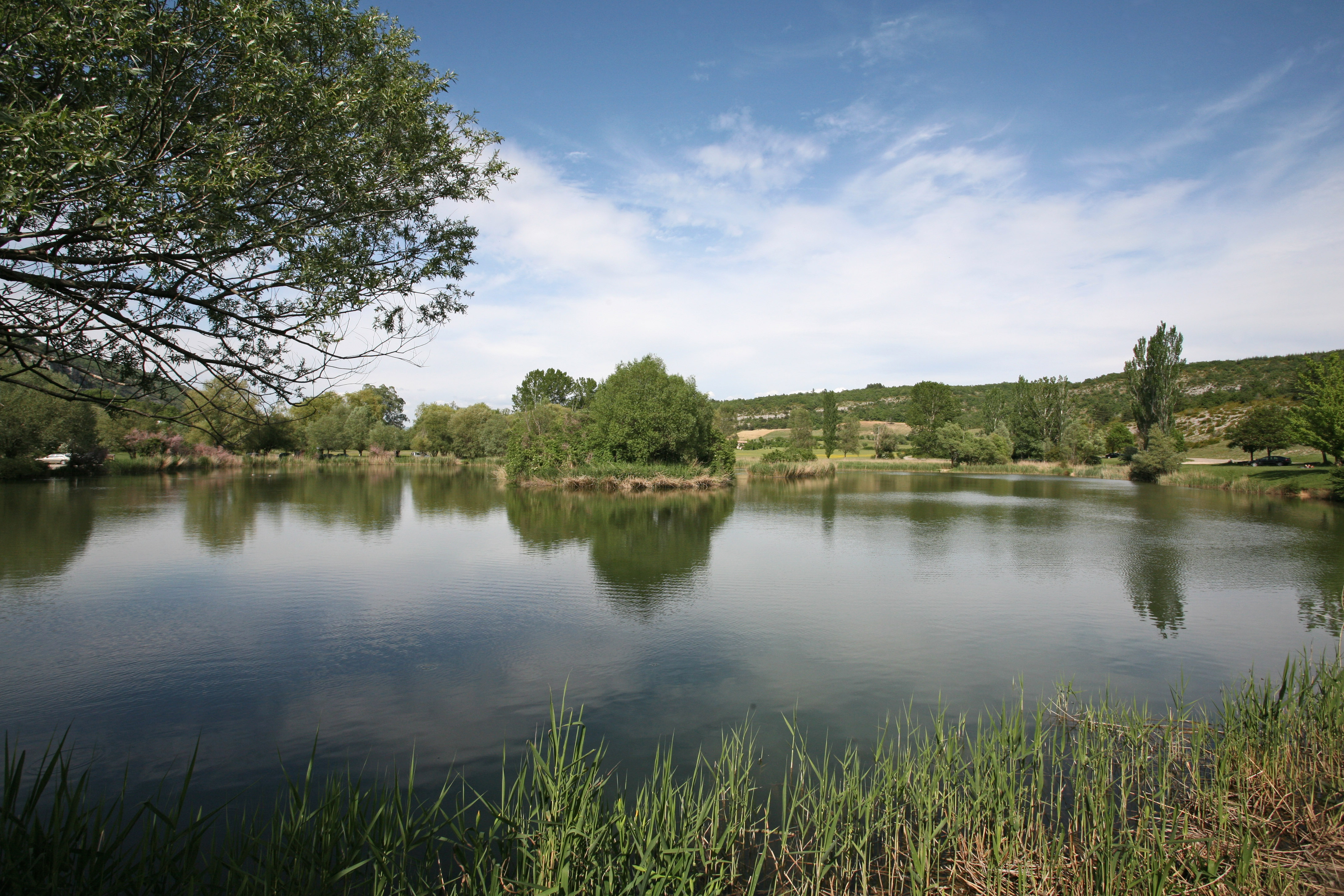
- From top down, left to right: prefecture building and Palais des Papes in Avignon, village of Gordes, Sénanque Abbey, Sorgue River and Nesque River

- Flag Coat of arms

- Location of Vaucluse in France
- Coordinates: 44°00′N 05°10′E
- Country: France
- Region: Provence-Alpes-Côte d'Azur
- Prefecture: Avignon
- Subprefectures: Apt; Carpentras

Government
  - President of the Departmental Council: Dominique Santoni (LR)

Area^{1}
  - Total: 3,567 km^{2} (1,377 sq mi)

Population (2023)
  - Total: 572,056
  - Rank: 47th
  - Density: 160.4/km^{2} (415.4/sq mi)
- Time zone: UTC+1 (CET)
  - Summer (DST): UTC+2 (CEST)
- Department number: 84
- Arrondissements: 3
- Cantons: 17
- Communes: 151
- ^1 French Land Register data, which exclude estuaries and lakes, ponds and glaciers larger than 1 km^{2} (0.39 sq mi)

Vaucluse (French: [voklyz]; Provençal: Vauclusa (Classical norm) or Vau-Cluso (Mistralian norm)) is a department in the southeastern French region of Provence-Alpes-Côte d'Azur. It had a population of 572,056 as of 2023. The department's prefecture is Avignon.

It is named after a spring, the Fontaine de Vaucluse, one of the largest karst springs in the world. The name Vaucluse itself derives from the Latin Vallis Clausa ("closed valley") as the valley ends in a cliff face from which the spring emanates.

== History ==
The department of Vaucluse was created on 12 August 1793 out of parts of the departments of Bouches-du-Rhône, Drôme and Basses-Alpes. The western part, the former Comtat Venaissin, had been part of the Papal States until 1791.

The then vastly rural department was, like the city of Lyon to the north, a hotbed of the French Resistance in World War II.

== Geography ==
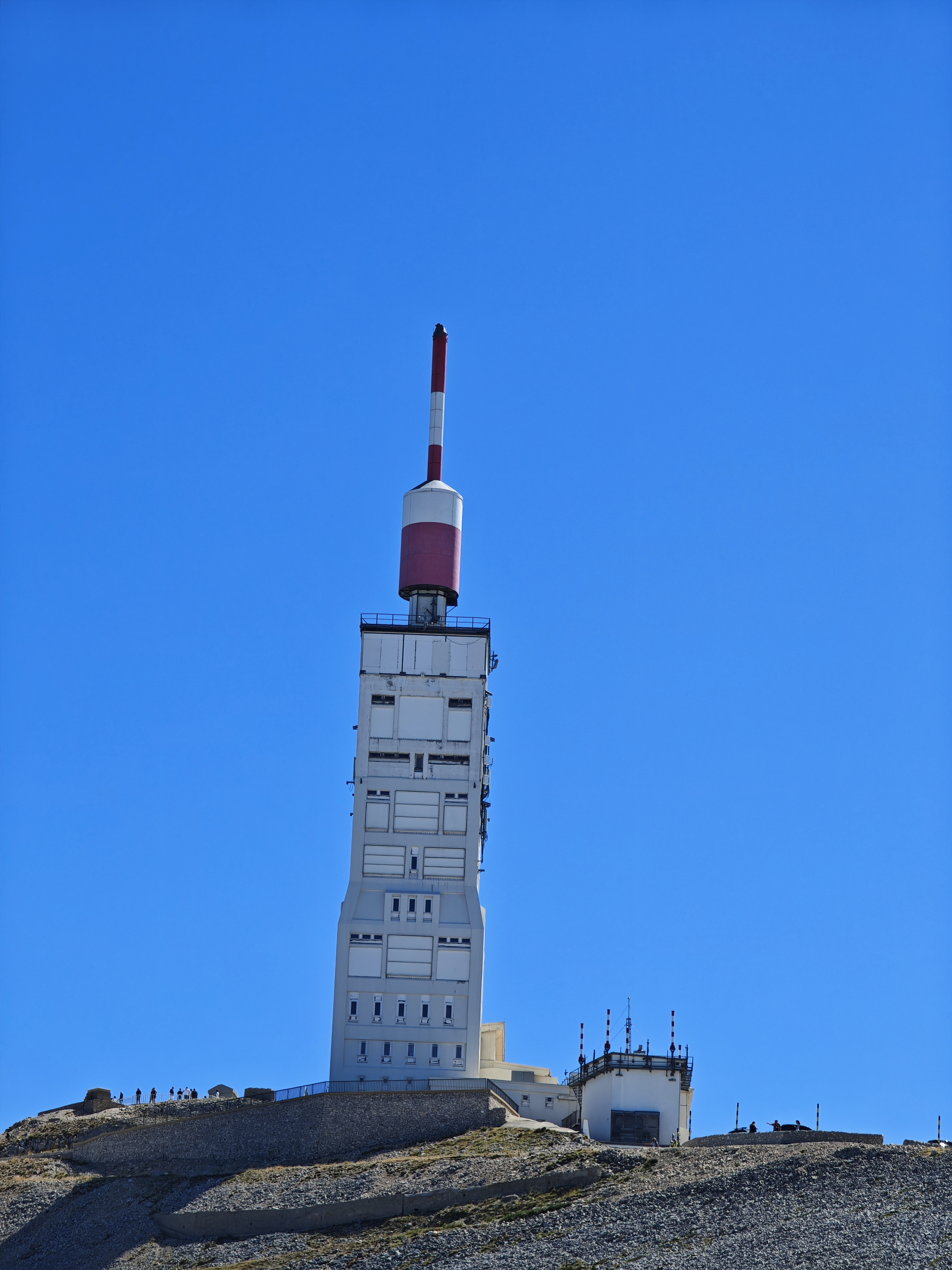
Summit tower on Mont Ventoux in Vaucluse

Vaucluse is bordered by the Rhône to the west (which marks the departmental border with Gard and regional border with Occitania) and the Durance to the south (which marks the border with Bouches-du-Rhône). To the north Vaucluse borders the region of Auvergne-Rhône-Alpes.

Mountains occupy a significant proportion of the eastern half of the department, with Mont Ventoux (1,912 m), also known as the "Giant of Provence", dominating the landscape. Other important mountain ranges include the Dentelles de Montmirail, the Monts de Vaucluse and the Luberon.

Fruit and vegetables are cultivated in great quantities in the lower-lying parts of the department, on one of the most fertile plains in Southern France. The Vaucluse department has a rather large exclave within the Drôme department to the north, the canton of Valréas (Enclave des Papes).

Vaucluse is also known for its karst, including the karst spring Fontaine de Vaucluse after which "Vauclusian Risings" are named.

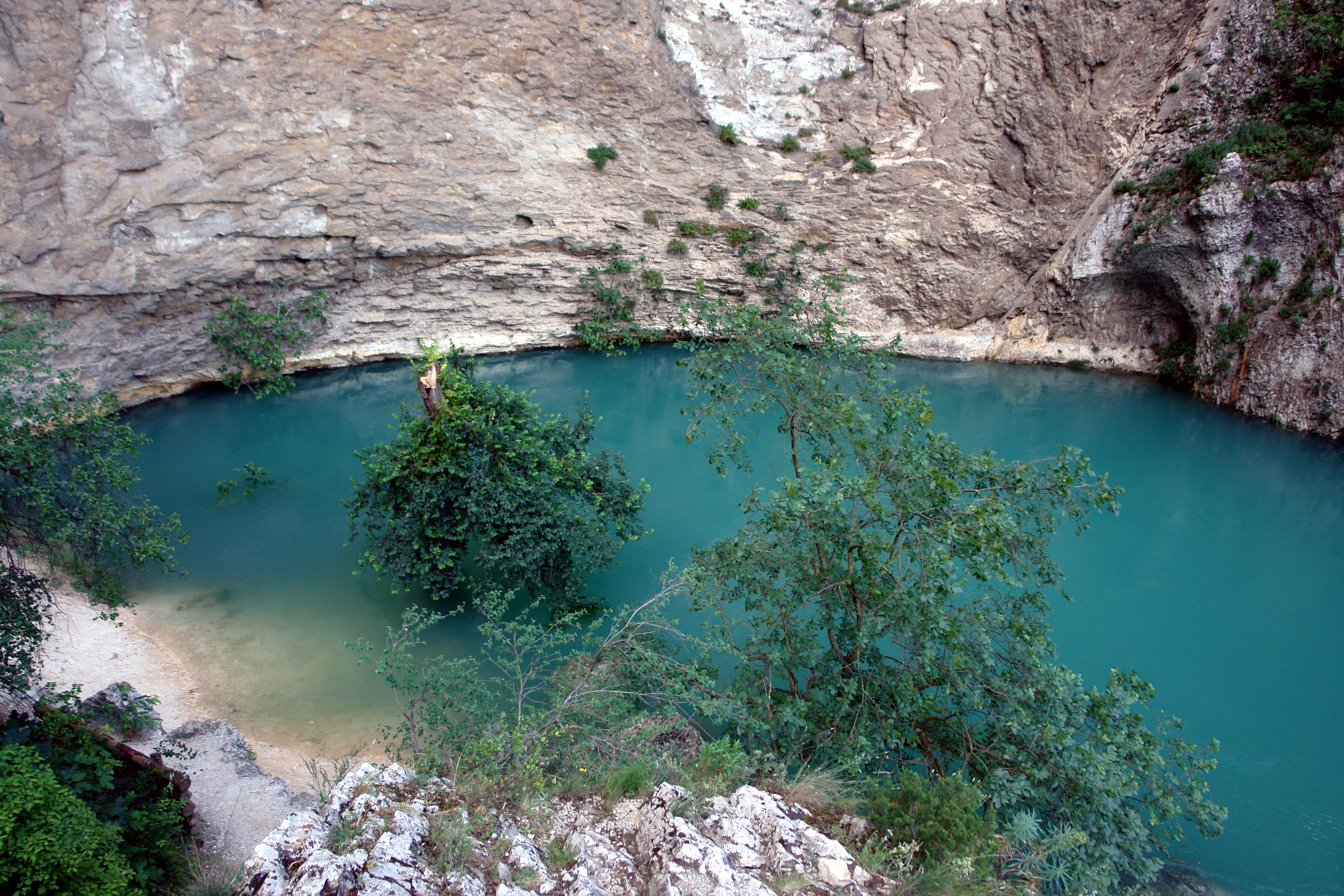
The Fontaine de Vaucluse is the source of the Sorgue. It is characterised by an upward movement of water from the depth of over 315 metres (1,033 ft).

=== Principal towns ===
The most populous commune is Avignon, the prefecture. As of 2023, there are eight communes with more than 15,000 inhabitants:

Commune	Population (2023)
Avignon	92,188
Carpentras	31,619
Orange	29,706
Cavaillon	25,636
L'Isle-sur-la-Sorgue	20,244
Pertuis	19,548
Sorgues	19,006
Le Pontet	18,386

== Demographics ==
Population development since 1801:

Historical population

Year	Pop.	±% p.a.
1801	191,421	—
1806	205,833	+1.46%
1821	224,431	+0.58%
1831	239,113	+0.64%
1841	251,080	+0.49%
1851	264,618	+0.53%
1861	268,255	+0.14%
1872	263,451	−0.16%
1881	244,149	−0.84%
1891	235,411	−0.36%
1901	236,949	+0.07%
1911	238,656	+0.07%
1921	219,602	−0.83%
1931	241,689	+0.96%

Year	Pop.	±% p.a.
1936	245,508	+0.31%
1946	249,838	+0.17%
1954	268,318	+0.90%
1962	303,536	+1.55%
1968	353,966	+2.59%
1975	390,446	+1.41%
1982	427,343	+1.30%
1990	467,075	+1.12%
1999	499,685	+0.75%
2007	538,141	+0.93%
2012	546,314	+0.30%
2017	559,479	+0.48%
2023	572,056	+0.37%

== Politics ==
=== Departmental council ===
Departmental Council of Vaucluse
Composition after the 2021 election

Following the 2021 departmental election, Dominique Santoni of The Republicans (LR) was elected President of the Departmental Council of Vaucluse. She succeeded Maurice Chabert, who had held the office since 2015.

The Departmental Council of Vaucluse has 34 seats (two per canton). The French Communist Party (PCF) has 1 seat, The Ecologists (LE) have 2, the Socialist Party (PS) has 5, the miscellaneous left (DVG) has 4, the miscellaneous right (DVD) has 1, the Radical Party (PR) has 1, The Republicans (LR) have 10, the National Rally (RN) has 6, the League of the South (LS) has 2, while 2 members are registered as miscellaneous (DIV).

=== Representation in Paris ===
==== National Assembly ====
Vaucluse is represented as follows in the National Assembly:

Constituency	Member	Party
Vaucluse's 1st	Raphaël Arnault	LFI
Vaucluse's 2nd	Bénédicte Auzanot	RN
Vaucluse's 3rd	Hervé de Lépinau	RN
Vaucluse's 4th	Marie-France Lorho	RN
Vaucluse's 5th	Catherine Rimbert	RN

==== Senate ====
Vaucluse is represented as follows in the Senate:

Senator	Party	Since
Jean-Baptiste Blanc	LR	2020
Alain Milon	LR	2004
Lucien Stanzione	PS	2020

== Transport ==
=== Air ===
Avignon–Provence Airport is the only airport in Vaucluse. However, there are no scheduled flights to and from the airport. Other nearby airports such as Marseille Provence Airport, Montpellier–Méditerranée Airport and Nice Côte d'Azur Airport are also used by air travellers from the department.

=== Rail ===
Vaucluse is served by Avignon TGV station on the LGV Méditerranée.

== Tourism ==
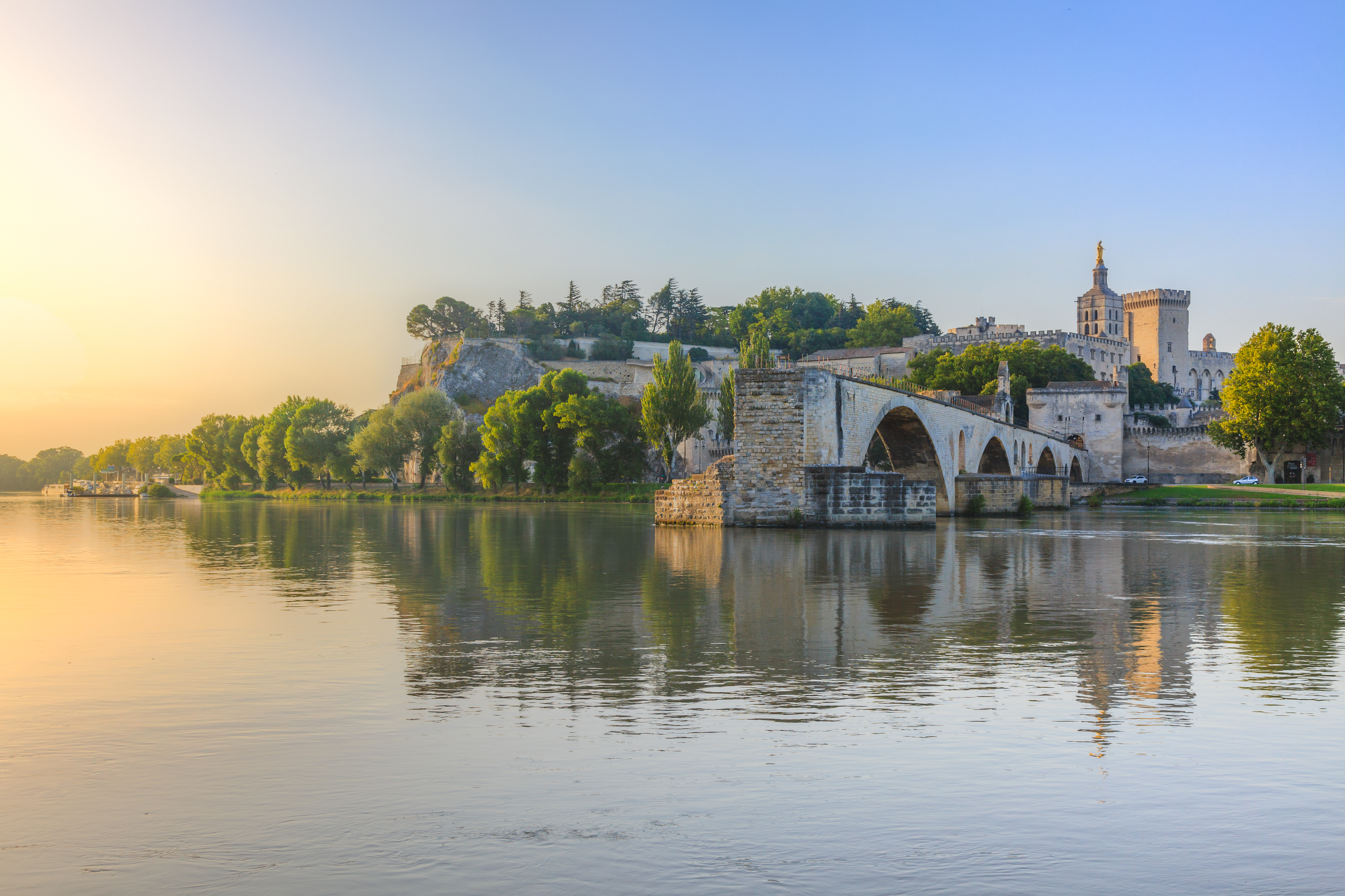
Pont Saint-Bénezet in Avignon

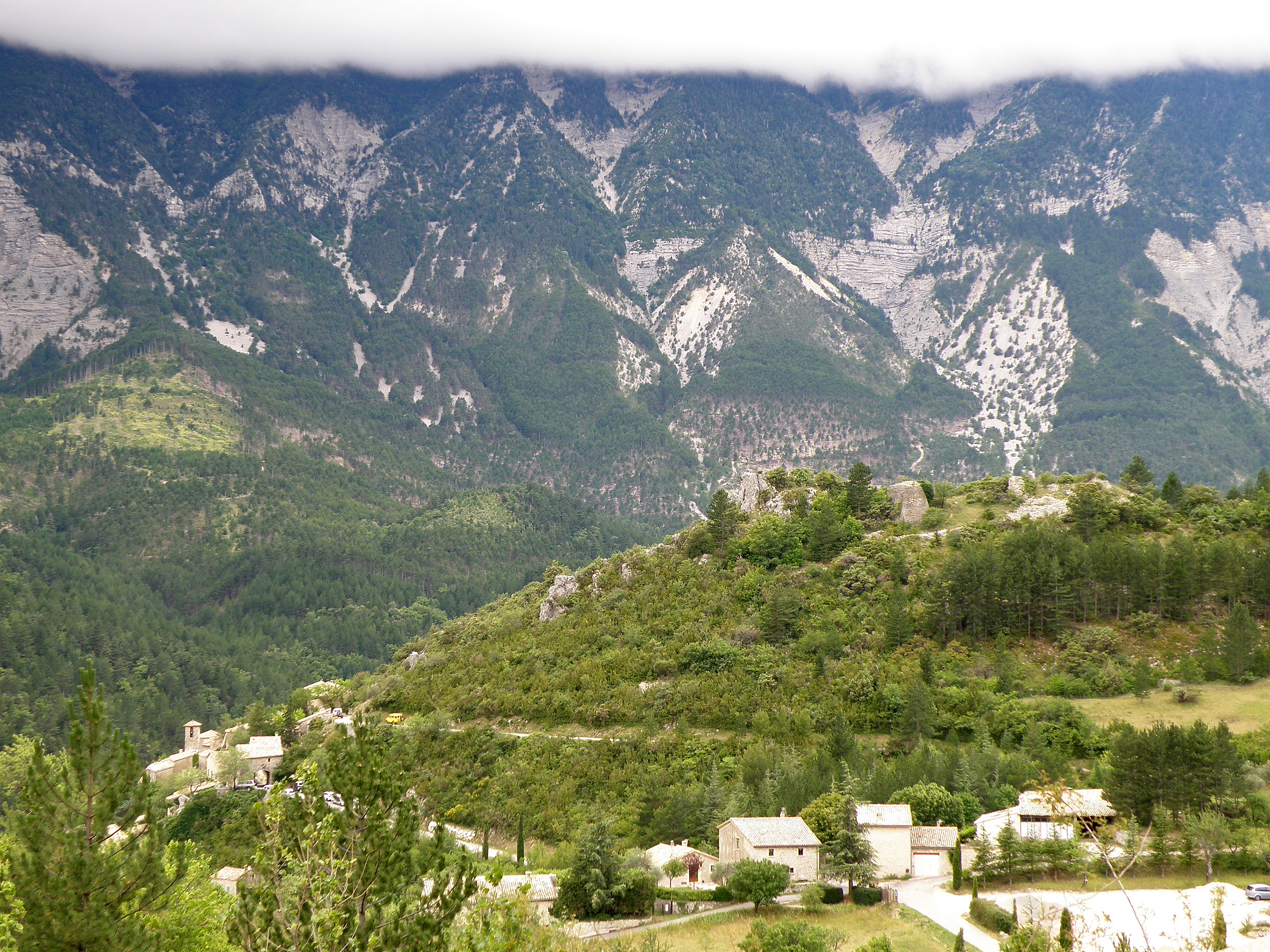
Brantes

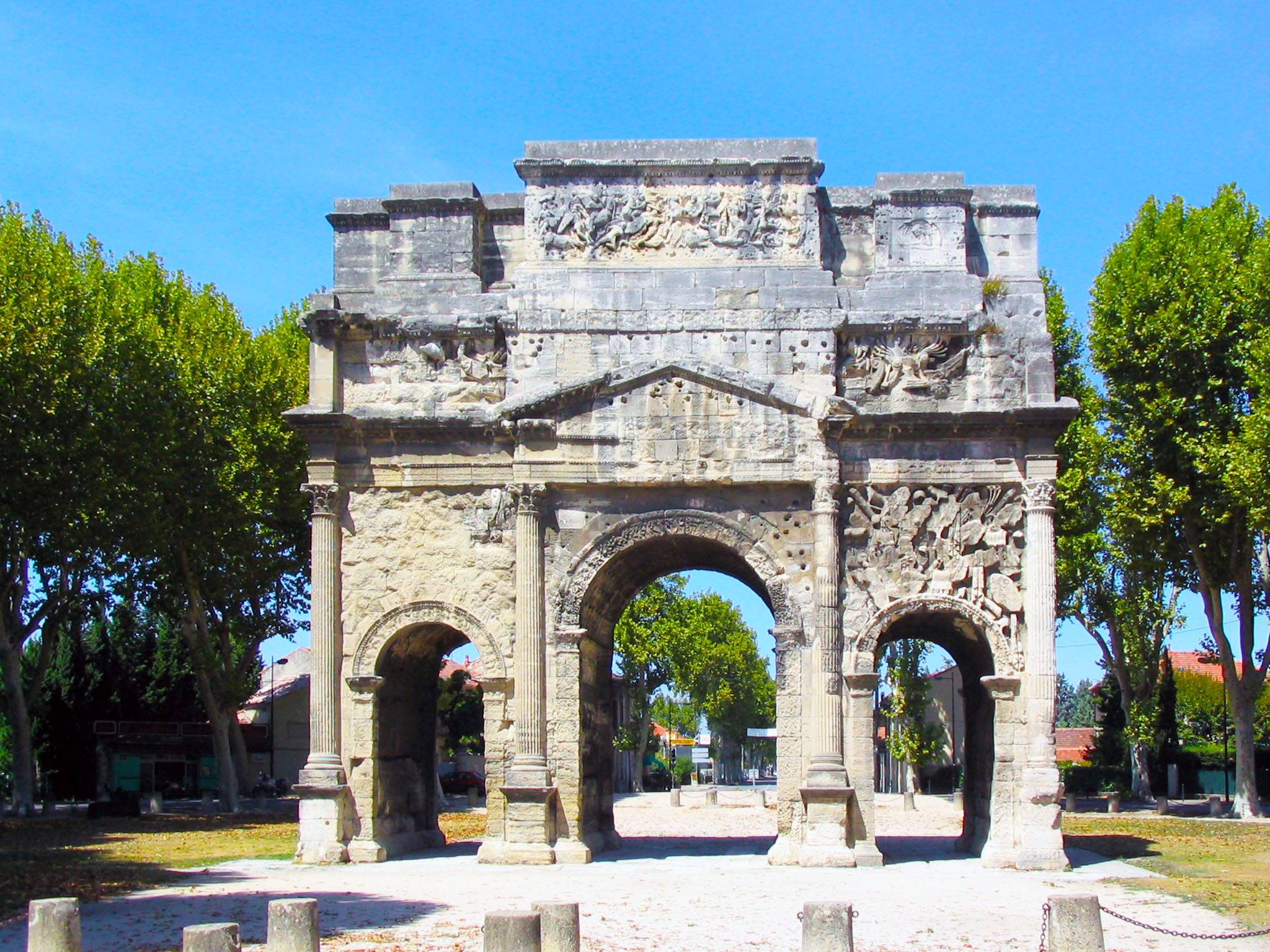
Triumphal Arch of Orange

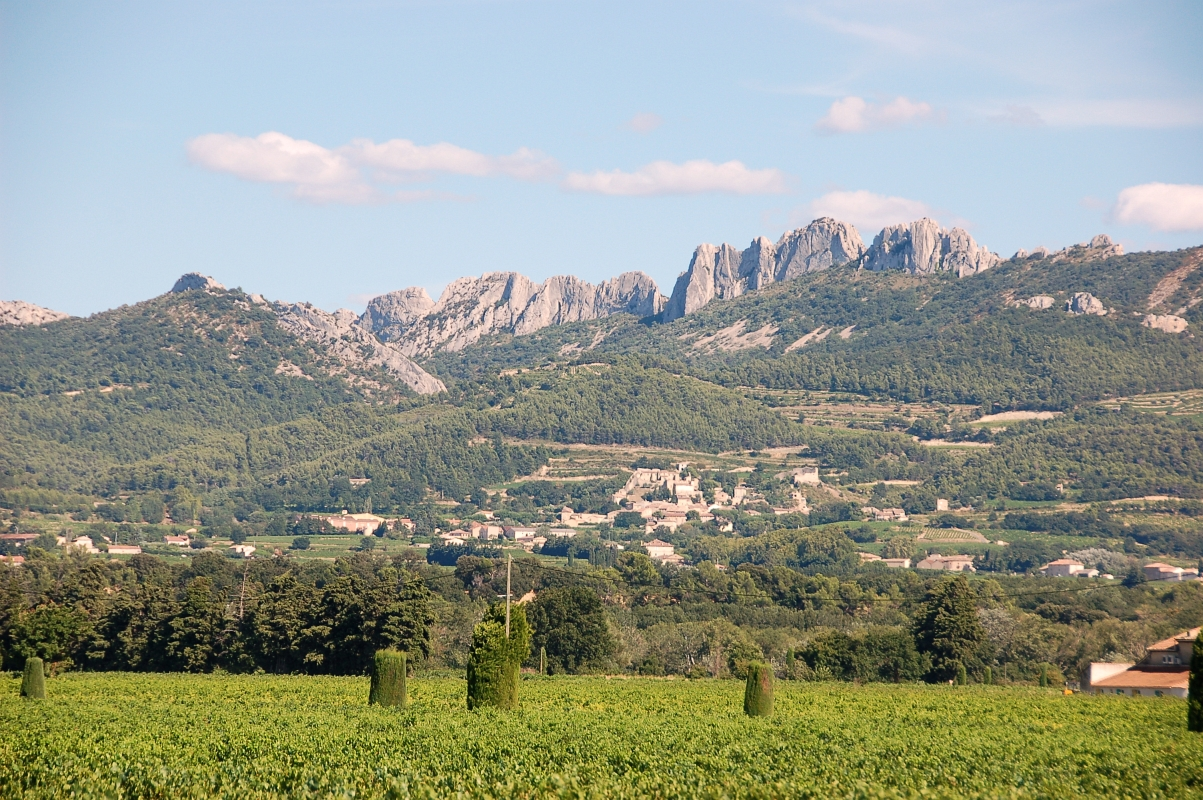
Dentelles de Montmirail

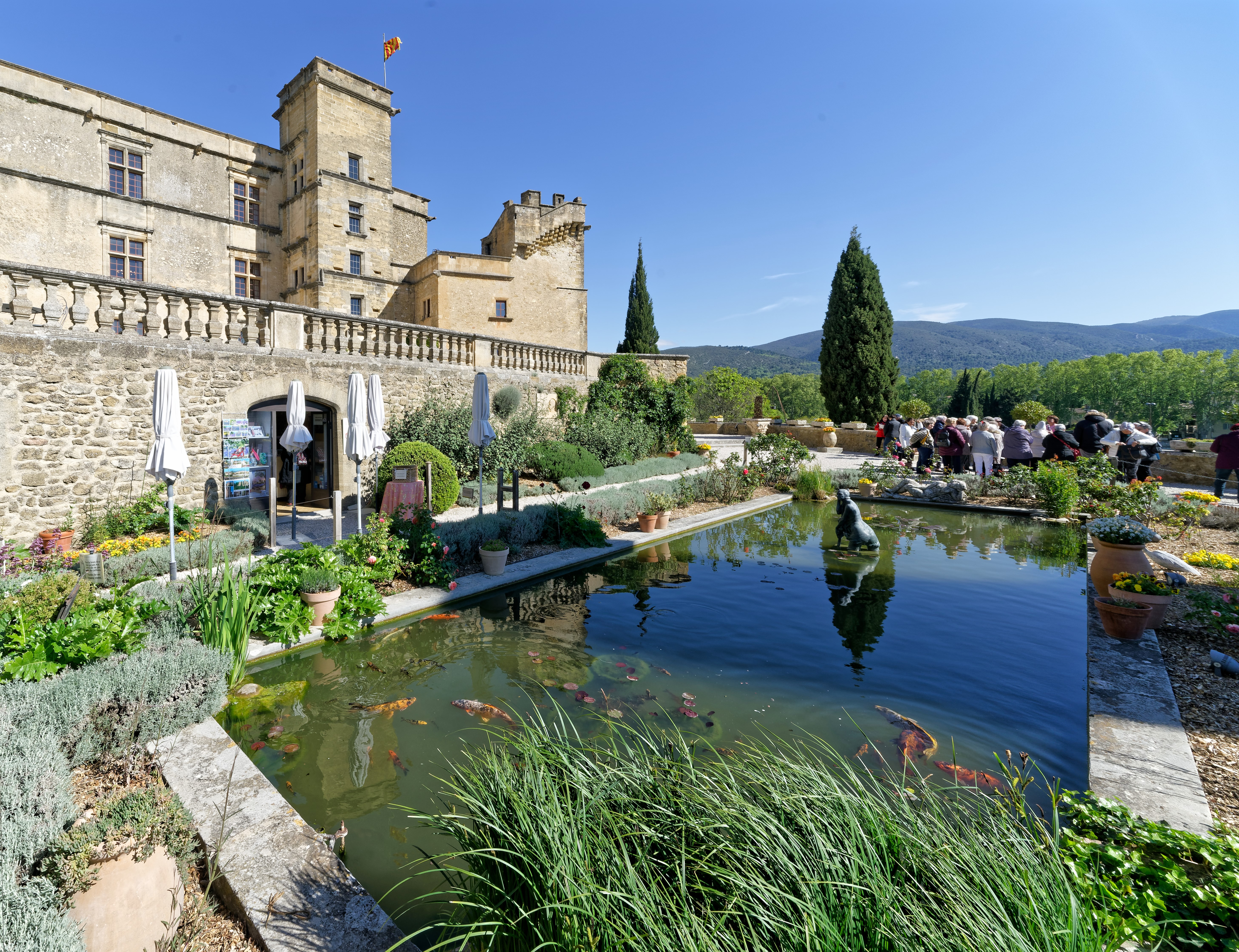
Château de Lourmarin

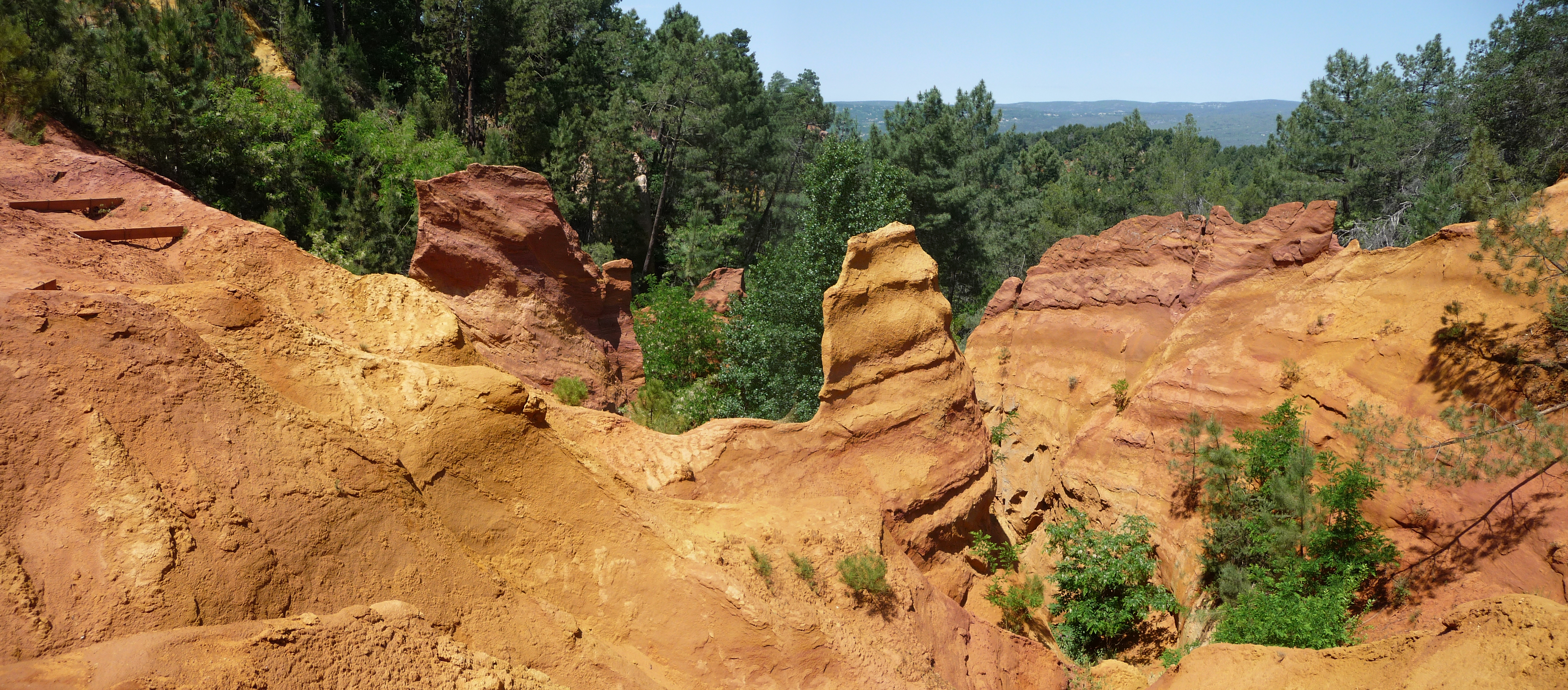
Roussillon

== See also ==
- Arrondissements of the Vaucluse department
- Cantons of the Vaucluse department
- Communes of the Vaucluse department
